= Liberty Hill Historic District =

Liberty Hill Historic District may refer to:

- Liberty Hill Historic District, Liberty Hill, South Carolina; NRHP-listed
- Liberty Hill Historic District, San Francisco, California; San Francisco Designated Landmark-listed

== See also ==
- Liberty Street Historic District (disambiguation)
