= Liberty Street =

Liberty Street can refer to:

- Liberty Street Historic District (disambiguation)
- Liberty Street (TV series), a Canadian TV show
- Liberty Street (Manhattan), a street in Lower Manhattan, New York City
- Liberty Street (Savannah, Georgia), major street in Savannah, Georgia
- Liberty Street, an imprint of Time Inc. Books
- "Liberty Street", a song from The New Basement Tapes
- Liberty Street, a never-built section of Disneyland that would evolve into Liberty Square in Walt Disney World

== See also ==
- 28 Liberty Street, a skyscraper in Lower Manhattan, New York City
