= Visitacion Valley, San Francisco =

Visitacion Valley
- Neighborhood of San Francisco
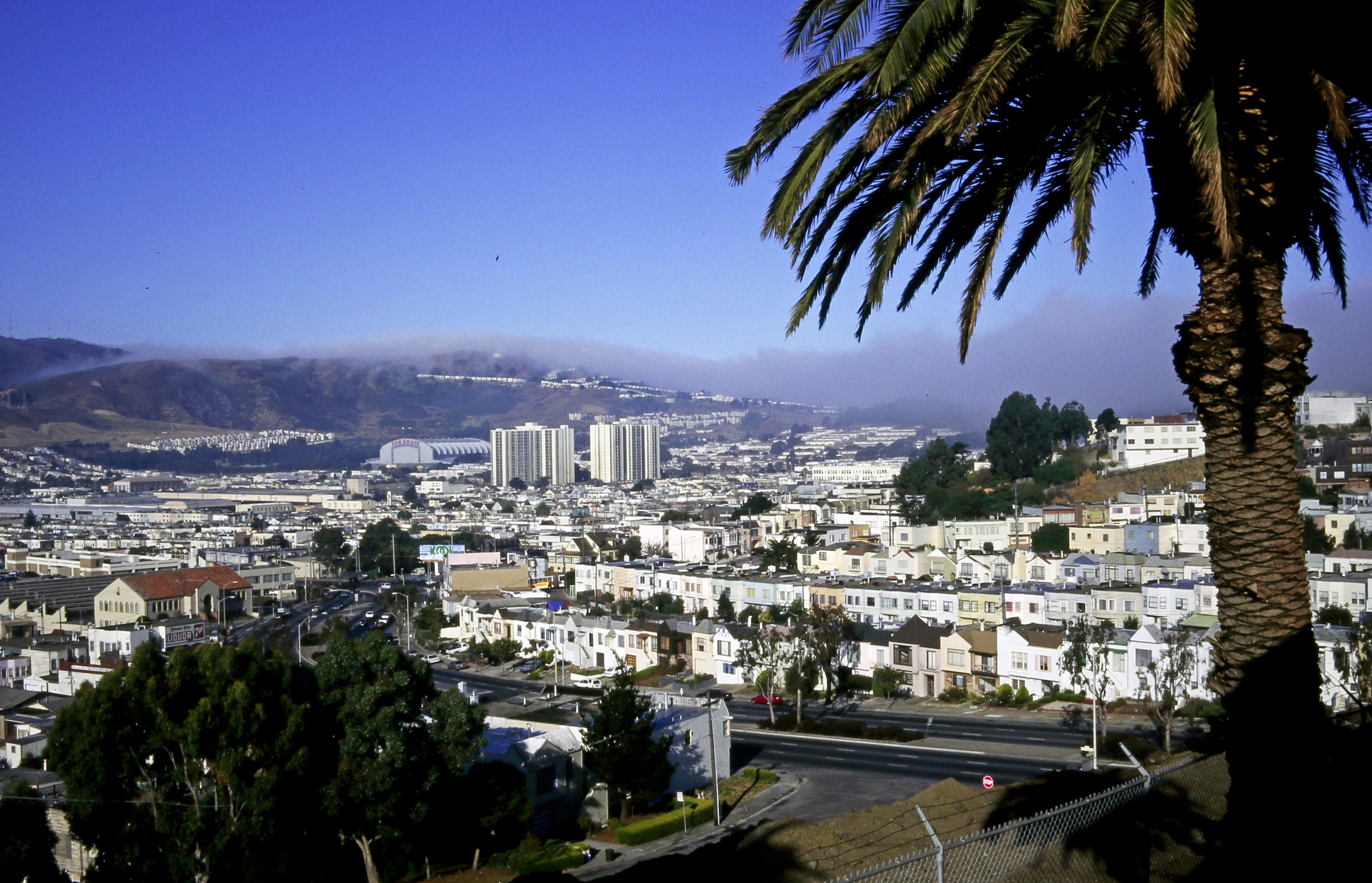
- Nickname: Viz Valley
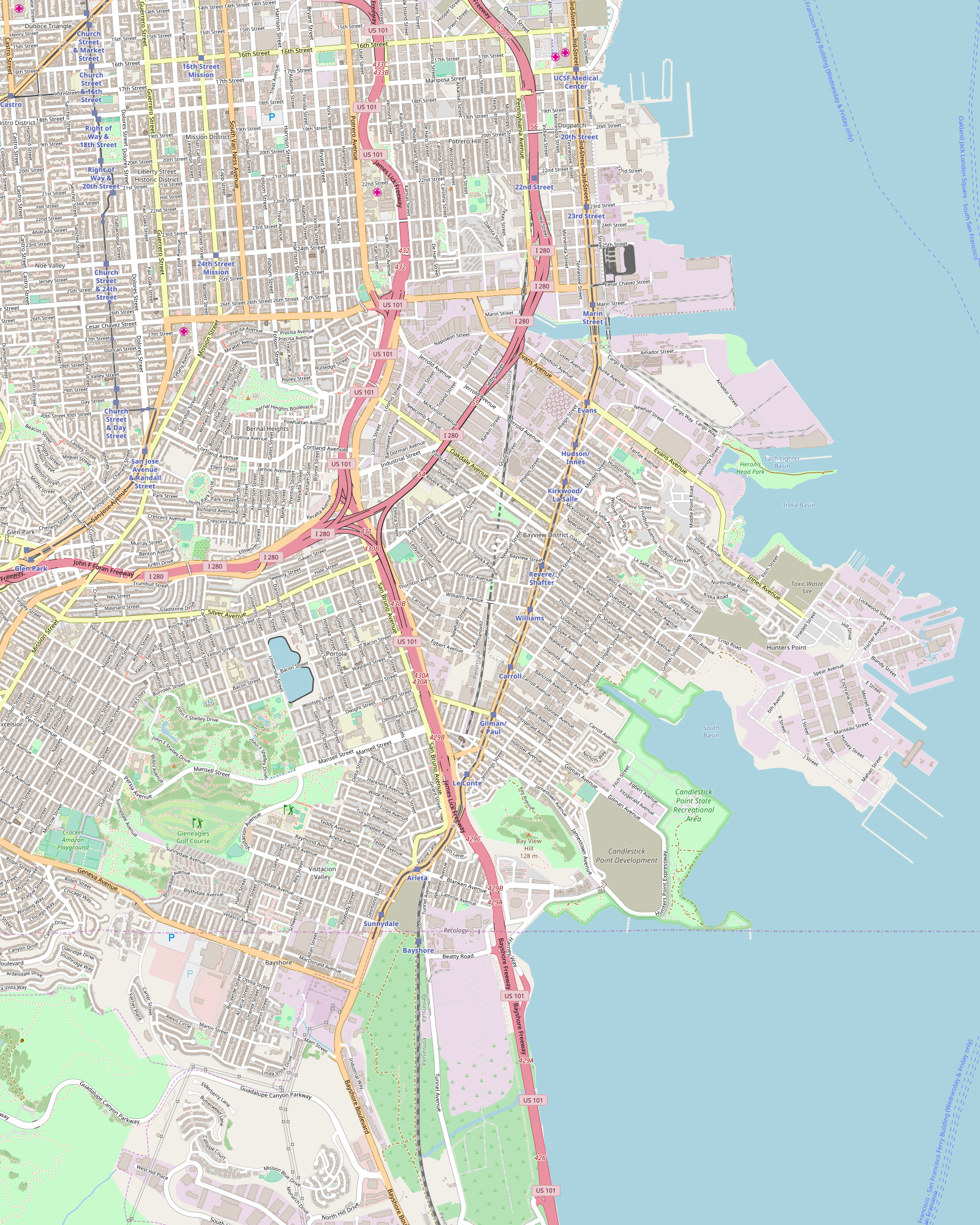
- Location within San Francisco Visitacion Valley (San Francisco County) Visitacion Valley (San Francisco Bay Area)
- Coordinates: 37.712574°N 122.407452°W
- State: California
- City: San Francisco

Government
  - Supervisor: Shamann Walton
  - CA Assembly: Matt Haney (D)
  - State Senator: Scott Wiener (D)
  - U.S. Rep.: Kevin Mullin (D)

Area
  - Total: 1.582 sq mi (4.10 km^{2})

Population (2022)
  - Total: 31,477
  - Density: 25,031/sq mi (9,665/km^{2})
- Time zone: UTC-8 (PST)
  - Summer (DST): UTC-7 (PDT)
- ZIP Code: 94134
- Area codes: 415/628

Visitacion Valley (VIZ-i-TAY-shən; Spanish: Valle de la Visitación), colloquially referred to as Viz Valley, is a neighborhood located in the southeastern quadrant of San Francisco, California.

Visitacion Valley is roughly defined by McLaren Park and Gleneagles Golf Course to the West, Mansell Blvd and Portola to the north, Bayview Hill and Candlestick Cove to the east, and the San Francisco / San Mateo County line to the south. The streets of this neighborhood straddle the border between San Francisco and Daly City, hence partially blending with the adjacent Daly City neighborhood of Bayshore. The grounds of the Cow Palace, straddling the San Francisco/Daly City border, parking areas are partially within Visitacion Valley.

The Sunnydale Housing Community, a predominately African-American and Pacific Islander American community, is located in Visitacion Valley.

== Name ==
In 1777, Spanish friars and soldiers on their way to the Presidio stopped at a valley between the present day San Bruno Mountain and John McLaren Park to celebrate the Catholic feast day of the Visitacion of the Blessed Virgin. They baptized the valley and named it Rancho Cañada de Guadalupe la Visitación y Rodeo Viejo - this tract of land also included the Bayshore district of Daly City, the city of Brisbane, and San Bruno Mountain. The neighborhood came to be known as Visitacion Valley.

The term "Visitacion" is Spanish and a reference to the Visitation in Luke 1:39 of the Bible. It is a visit by Mary, bearing the child Jesus, to her cousin Elizabeth, who despite her advanced years is pregnant with John the Baptist. John leapt in the womb as Mary entered, knowing that he is in the presence of the Savior.

== Characteristics ==
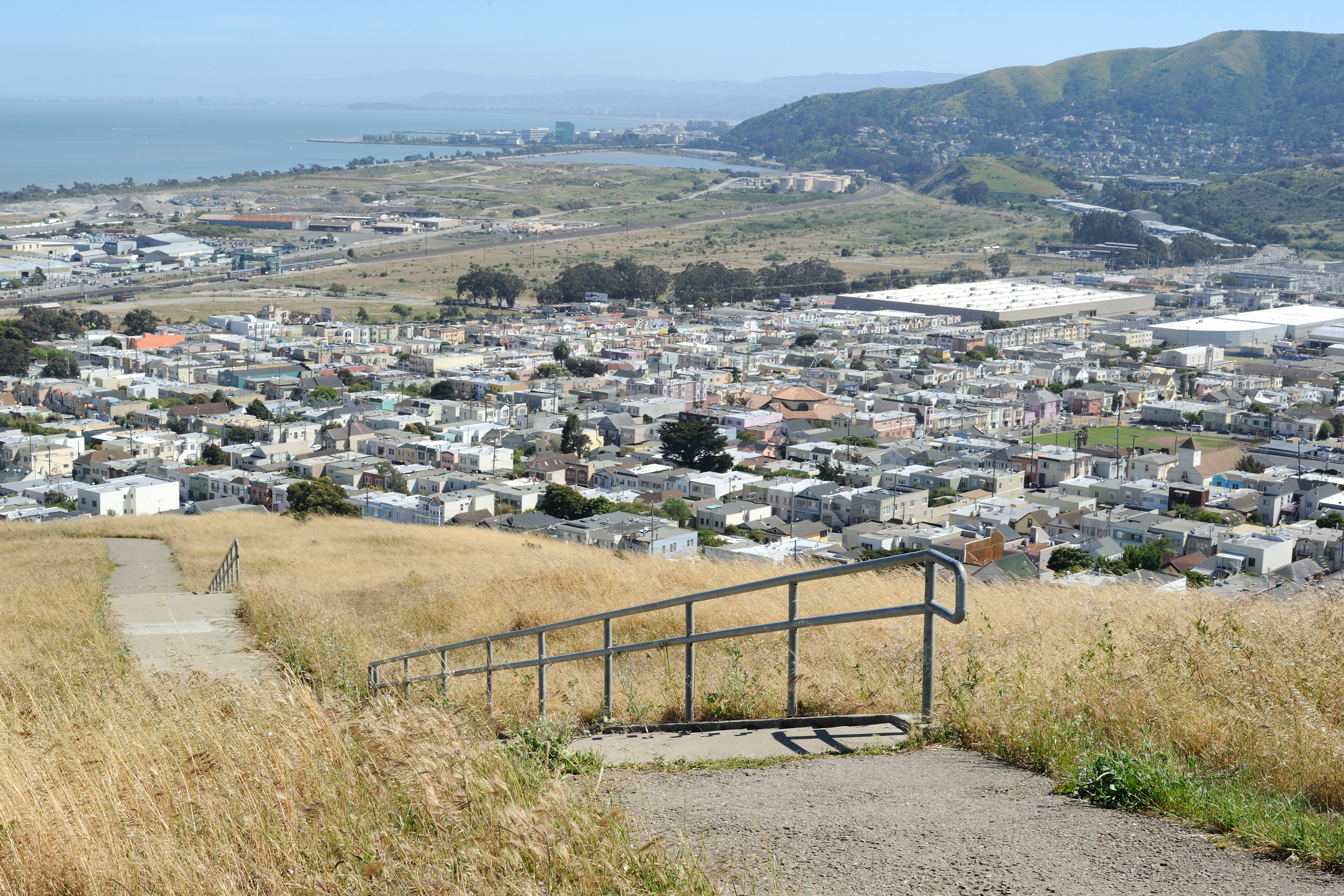
View southeast to Visitacion Valley and Brisbane from Visitacion Ave and Mansell Street in John McLaren Park. The stairs lead to Wilde Avenue.

Visitacion Valley is a residential, family-oriented, working-class neighborhood. Average incomes and housing price for the area is lower than the citywide average.

Visitacion Valley is sometimes dubbed "Forgotten Valley" due to policy makers' tendency to neglect the neighborhood. In the 1990s, United States Department of Housing and Urban Development (HUD) called Visitacion Valley “a neglected urban backwater of 18,000 with rampant crime, awful schools, and a deplorable housing project called Geneva Towers.” It has also been labeled by news media as San Francisco's least known neighborhood. Despite the sentiment, Schlage Lock Factory Redevelopment, one of the city's largest developments has been approved and waiting to break ground in Visitacion Valley.

The neighborhood was designated a "food desert" by the U.S. Department of Agriculture - with limited to no fresh food retail option. It did not have a grocery store for decades until a Grocery Outlet opened in 2014. Local businesses and community leaders said the neighborhood restaurants generally do not draw outsiders to the area. They cited the Schlage Lock Factory Redevelopment as the key in the revitalization of Visitacion Valley.

The neighborhood is very diverse with Asians and immigrants making up more than half of the population. As more Asians and Latinos moved into the neighborhood, Whites and Blacks population have dwindled. Crime and safety have also improved with the migration of the newcomers.

== History ==
The bayside valley was home to two Yelamu settlements (Amuctac and Tubsinte) when the Spanish claimed the valley as grazing land for cattle. After Mexico gained independence from Spain. The Mexican imperial court granted Rancho Cañada de Guadalupe la Visitación y Rodeo Viejo, which included Visitacion Valley, to American trader Jacob Leese in 1830.

The area was settled by German, French, Italian, Jewish, and Maltese immigrants during the Gold Rush to establish farms, dairies, and nurseries in the mid-1800s. This neighborhood featured many windmills for agricultural irrigation and was known as "Valley of the Windmills."

The neighborhood once had the largest Maltese population outside of Malta.

In 1907, Southern Pacific Railway constructed the Bayshore Cutoff - a sprawling 200 acres railyard that cut off Visitacion streets from the bay. It was the central maintenance center for the rail company and employed many Visitacion Valley locals. The yard was demolished in 2009 (along with adjacent Schlage Lock factory), more information at Schlage Lock Factory and Southern Pacific Railyard Redevelopment.

Schlage Lock Company factory was constructed in 1926 and dominated the area's economy for decades. It was shut down in 1999. The land (along with adjacent Southern Pacific Railyard) was demolished and a large scale mixed-use development (Bayland North) that will add over 2,000 housing units has been approved by the city.

The construction of the nearby Hunters Point Naval Shipyard during World War II, led to a massive influx of African Americans who worked in the shipyards. Many settled in the Sunnydale Projects which were originally constructed as barracks to house workers. After the war ended, more African Americans relocated from the Fillmore District and the Western Addition when the Urban Renewal (operated by San Francisco Redevelopment Agency) program uprooted them and their businesses.

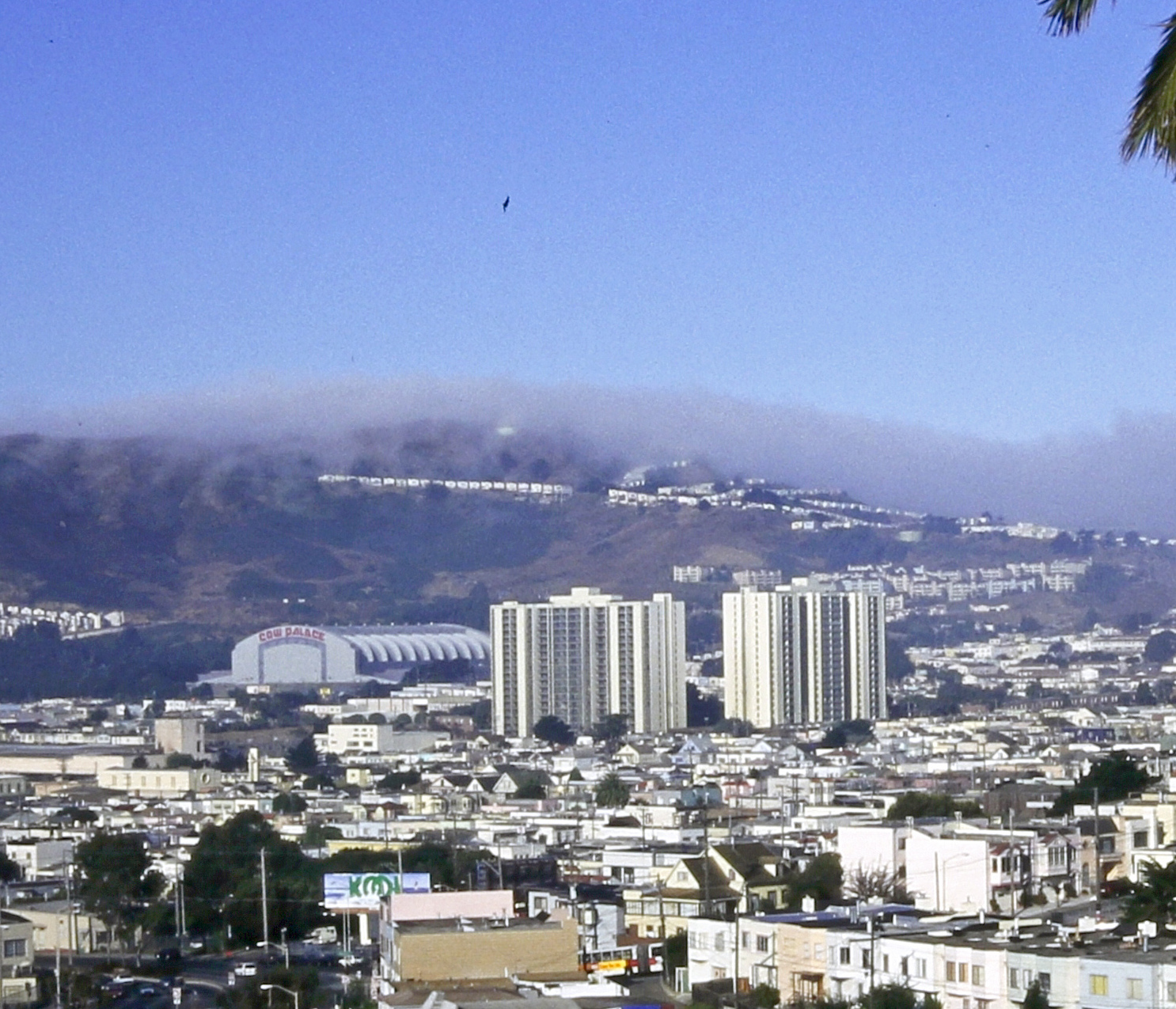
The two high-rise apartment buildings in the center of this photograph (Geneva Towers) were originally built as private housing in the 1960s and converted to public housing in the 1970s. The Geneva Towers were demolished in May 1998.

A former army barracks built in 1941 that was turned into low-income housing projects after the war, the Sunnydale Projects is the largest public housing community in San Francisco and is one of the most violent places in the city. Plans are in progress to redevelop the housing project, more information at Sunnydale Housing Project.

In the 1960s, famed real estate developer Joseph Eichler build two towers called Geneva Towers using federal aid designed to fund affordable rental housing for middle-incomers. Vice President Hubert Humphrey was present for the dedication of the towers in 1965. In 1967, Eichler ran into financial trouble and the Geneva Towers went into receivership. The Housing Authority of San Francisco eventually took over the management and turned the towers into rentals for Section 8 tenants. The towers suffered through dilapidation and poor maintenance throughout the 1980s and were plagued by gangs and drug activity. The City ordered the destruction of the buildings in 1998 and replaced them with lower-density units.

During the 1970s, with the closing of the Bayshore Cutoff and the Schlage Lock Factory winding down its business, the neighborhood experienced economic decline.

Beginning around the late 1980s, Chinese American (mostly immigrants) began to move into the neighborhood. Today, more than half of the neighborhood's population is Chinese Locals cite the demolishment of the Geneva Towers and the influx of Asians and Latinos as a huge boost in the turnaround for the neighborhood.

== Demographics ==
According to the 2020 census data gathered by the San Francisco Planning Dept.

Population
Total Population	19,875
2010 to 2020 Population Growth	10.1%

Income
Median Household Income	$74,376
2010-20 Income Growth	72%

Housing
Median Home Value	$834,000
Median Rent Value	$1,381

Race/Ethnicity
Asian	52%
Latino (of any race)	25%
Not listed/Multi-racial	21%
White	15%
African American	9%
American Indian	0%

Households
Family Households	77%
Households with 60 years and older	48%
Households with Children	38%
Non-Family Households	23%
Single Person Households	15%
Single Senior (65+) Households	6%
Avg. Household Size	3.7
Avg. Family Household Size	4.4

Educational Attainment (Residents 25 years and older)
Less than high school degree	24%
High school degree or equivalent	28%
Some College/Associate Degree	26%
Bachelor degree or higher	23%

== Schlage Lock Factory Redevelopment ==
=== Background ===
In 1999, the Schlage Lock Factory was permanently closed and its 12.3 acres of land was boarded up. Home Depot proposed to build a big box store in March 2000. This proposal was dropped in January 2001 after opposition by neighborhood interests and local politicians. The San Francisco Board of Supervisors subsequently approved an interim zoning change of the land to low-density commercial to prevent big-box retails from moving in while they evaluate redevelopment of the land.

In 2008, Universal Paragon Corp (UPC) took over the site from Ingersoll-Rand Co. of Montvale, N.J., who owned the land and the Schlage Lock Factory as part of a lawsuit settlement. As part of the settlement, UPC agreed to clean up the contamination on the site and redevelop the land into a transit-friendly community with housing and commercial space.

In 2009, after a series of reviews and delays, the Board of Supervisors approved a plan to develop the vacant land at Schlage Lock Factory and Southern Pacific Railway, naming it the Visitacion Valley Redevelopment Area. The plan also includes improvement to Leland Avenue and Bayshore Boulevard That same year, all structures on the Schlage Lock Factory and its adjoining Southern Pacific Railyard site were demolished; save for the Schlage Lock Factory Headquarter building which would be retrofitted and became a community center.

=== Baylands North ===
The San Francisco Redevelopment Agency ceased to exist in 2012 along with the funding for the project. The Planning Department and the Mayor's Office of Economic and Workforce Development joined forces to help pass a revised development plan. In 2014, the Board of Supervisors approved the plan for UPC to redevelop the Schlage Lock Factory land. Known as Baylands North, the project would be built out over a 15-year period. Baylands North is part of a larger Brisbane Baylands development that spans San Francisco and Brisbane, CA. The Baylands project originally was planned for 5,400 homes and 8.5 million square feet of commercial space. In 2018, both San Francisco and San Mateo counties finalized the Baylands project to consist of 1,674 housing units on the former Schlage Lock land and 2,200 housing units on the Brisbane side. The Brisbane side also consists of 6.5 million sq. ft. of biotech and office space.

In 2023, news outlet reported that Phase 1 of the project would break ground in 2024. It would have consisted of six buildings, 594 housing units, two parks, a renovated Bayshore Caltrain station and a pedestrian-oriented retail strip. However, a report released by the San Francisco City and County in Oct 2024 lists the Baylands North's start date as TBD. As of early 2025, construction for phase 1 of the project has not been started.

Development of the land was stalled for several years while UPC cleared the site of contamination, a process that eventually cost $30 million. UPC was also responsible for building extensions of Leland Avenue and sewer and other utility lines ($30 million) and restoration of the historic Schlage Lock Headquarter ($11 million).

== Sunnydale Housing Project and Redevelopment ==
Originally constructed as temporary housing for the military during WWII, the Sunnydale Housing became permanent residence for low-income residents after the war. The housing project is in a decrepit state and has a reputation as crime ridden and dangerous

Hope SF, a non-profit community development initiative, is partnering with the city to redevelop the Sunnydale housing project - to demolish existing structures and add 1,700 new units. Controversy araised when the Board of Supervisors withheld funding for the project over the high estimated cost of construction. The funding was eventually approved and Blocks 3A and 3B were demolished in 2023. 170 new units and 24,000 sq. ft. of commercial space were built. The project is currently in phase 1A3, which includes the building of a new 35,000 sq. ft. community hub and outdoor space.

== More Recent developments ==
=== T-Third Rail ===
The existing T-Third rail that starts at Sunnydale Station and terminates at Mission Bay was extended to Union Square and Chinatown. This extension is part of a major project of Central Subway that extends Muni to connect the southeast and the northeast section of the city. It began weekend services to the new stations in November 2022 and full operation on Jan 7, 2023.

=== San Francisco Public Library ===
The old Visitacion Valley Branch of the San Francisco Public Library was leased out of a small storefront at 45 Leland Ave. The new, permanent branch is now closer to Visitacion Valley Elementary School. It opened on July 30, 2011, at 201 Leland Ave, at the site of the former Super Fair Market.

== Churches ==
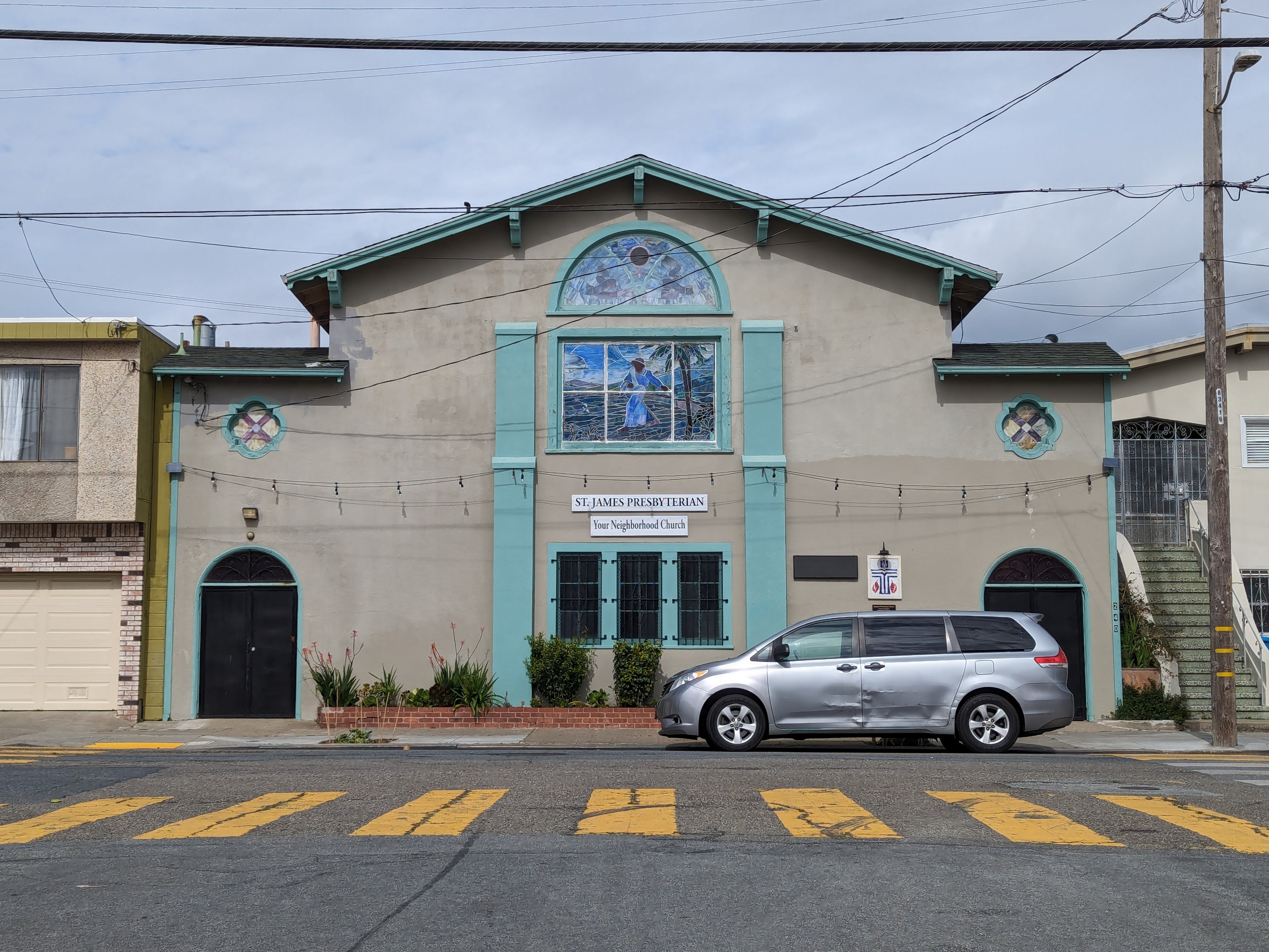
St. James Presbyterian Church

The St. James Presbyterian Church was erected at 240 Leland Avenue in 1906. The current building was built in 1923 and designed by San Francisco Bay Area native architect Julia Morgan. The neighborhood community and S.F. Heritage is advocating for this church as a historical landmark.

In 1907, Archbishop Patrick William Riordan established a new parish in the Visitacion Valley. The original church was built on Cora Street, between Sunnydale and Visitacion avenues. In 1909, the church was located at the corner of Loehr Street and Visitacion Avenue. The third church was located between Raymond Avenue and Delta Street, using the material from the second church. The current Church of the Visitacion is located at 655 Sunnydale Avenue, which has been there since at least 1961. The Our Lady of the Visitacion School private Catholic K–8 school is located on the premises. Its student population is close to 50% Filipino Americans. Former California governor Peter Hardeman Burnett's house was also on the premises, on what was then called Burnet Grove. The house was later torn down to make way for the construction of the school.

== Media ==
The neighborhood was featured in the 1958 film The Lineup and the 2004 television film Sucker Free City.

In 1986, the Visitacion Valley Community Center began printing the free Visitacion Valley Grapevine community newspaper. In 2011, it ceased production, due to statewide budget cuts; it had a 25-year run.

== Events ==
In 2006, the annual Visitacion Valley Festival began, a street fair hosted along the commercial Leland Avenue and organized by the volunteer group Visitacion Valley Connections.

== Education ==
=== Elementary ===
- Visitacion Valley Elementary School
- El Dorado Elementary School

=== Middle school ===
- Visitacion Valley Middle School
- Our Lady of the Visitacion School (K–8)

== Notable past residents ==
- Peter Hardeman Burnett, California governor (1849–1851)
- Rikishi (Solofa F. Fatu Jr.), American professional wrestler
- Dan White, San Francisco supervisor who assassinated Supervisor Harvey Milk and Mayor George Moscone in 1978
- Yik Oi Huang (1930–2020), Chinese-American community figure

== Gallery ==
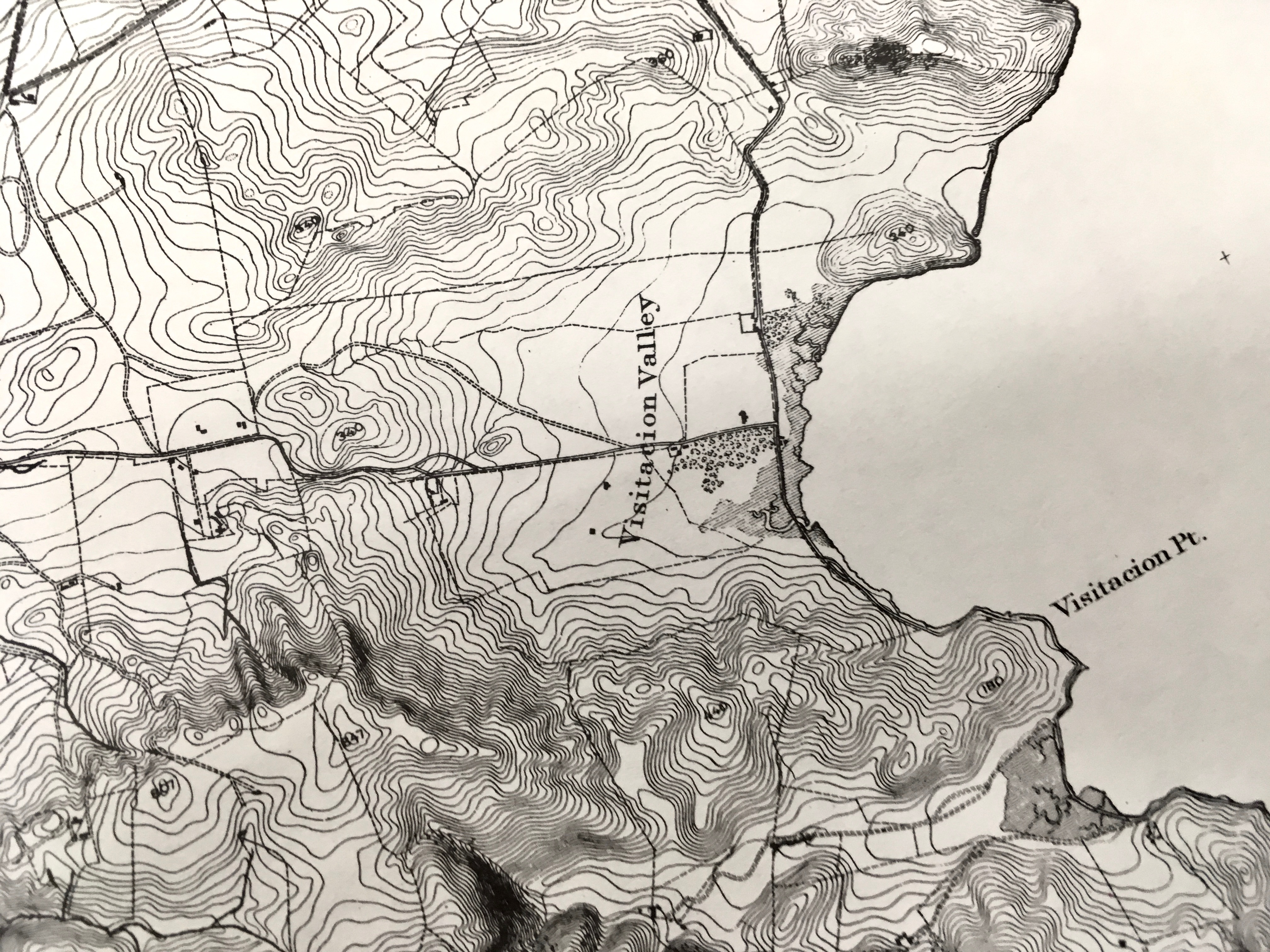
Elevation map of Visitacion Valley, 1869

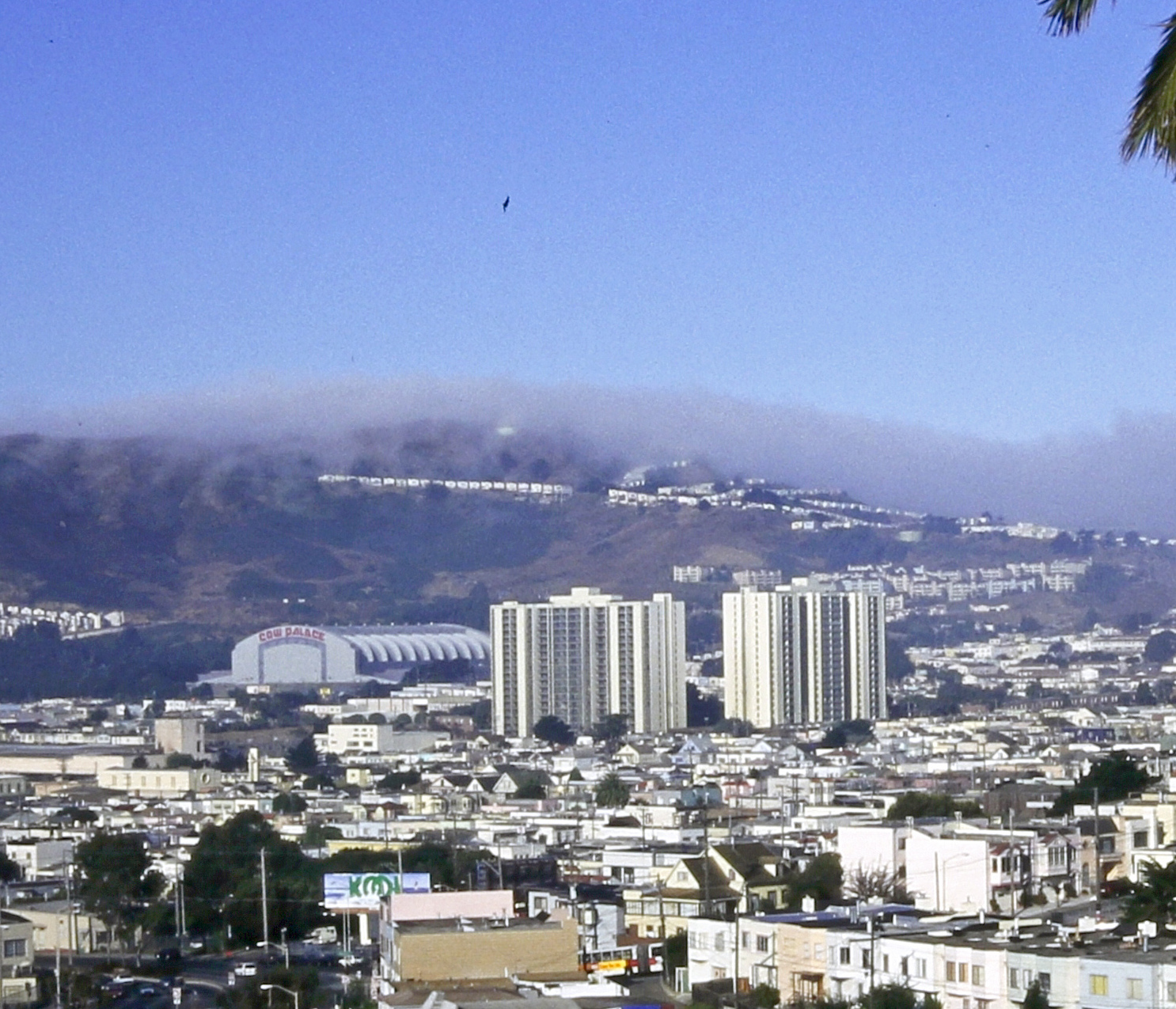
Geneva Towers and Cow Palace, 1996

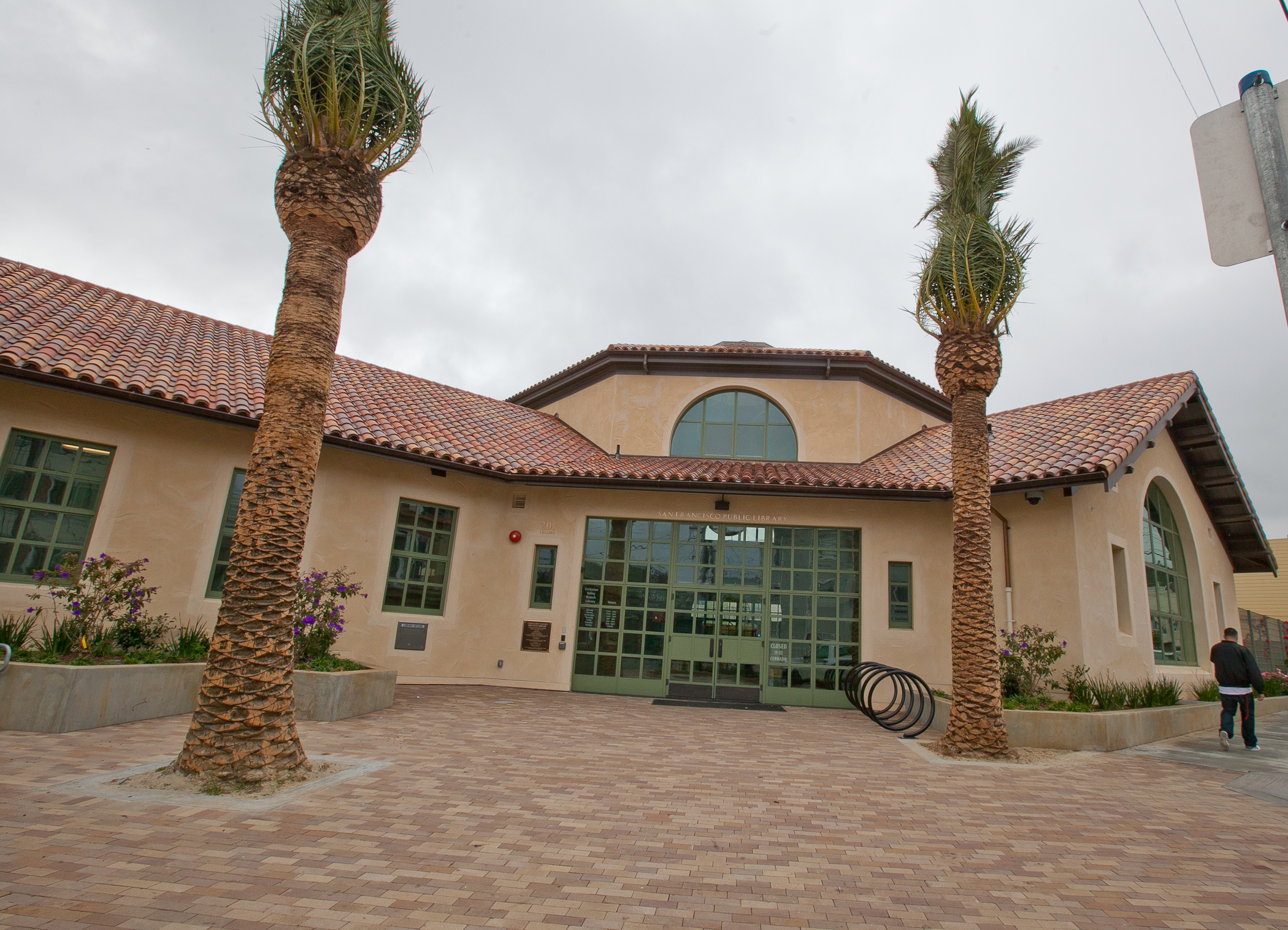
Exterior of new Visitacion Valley Branch library, 2011

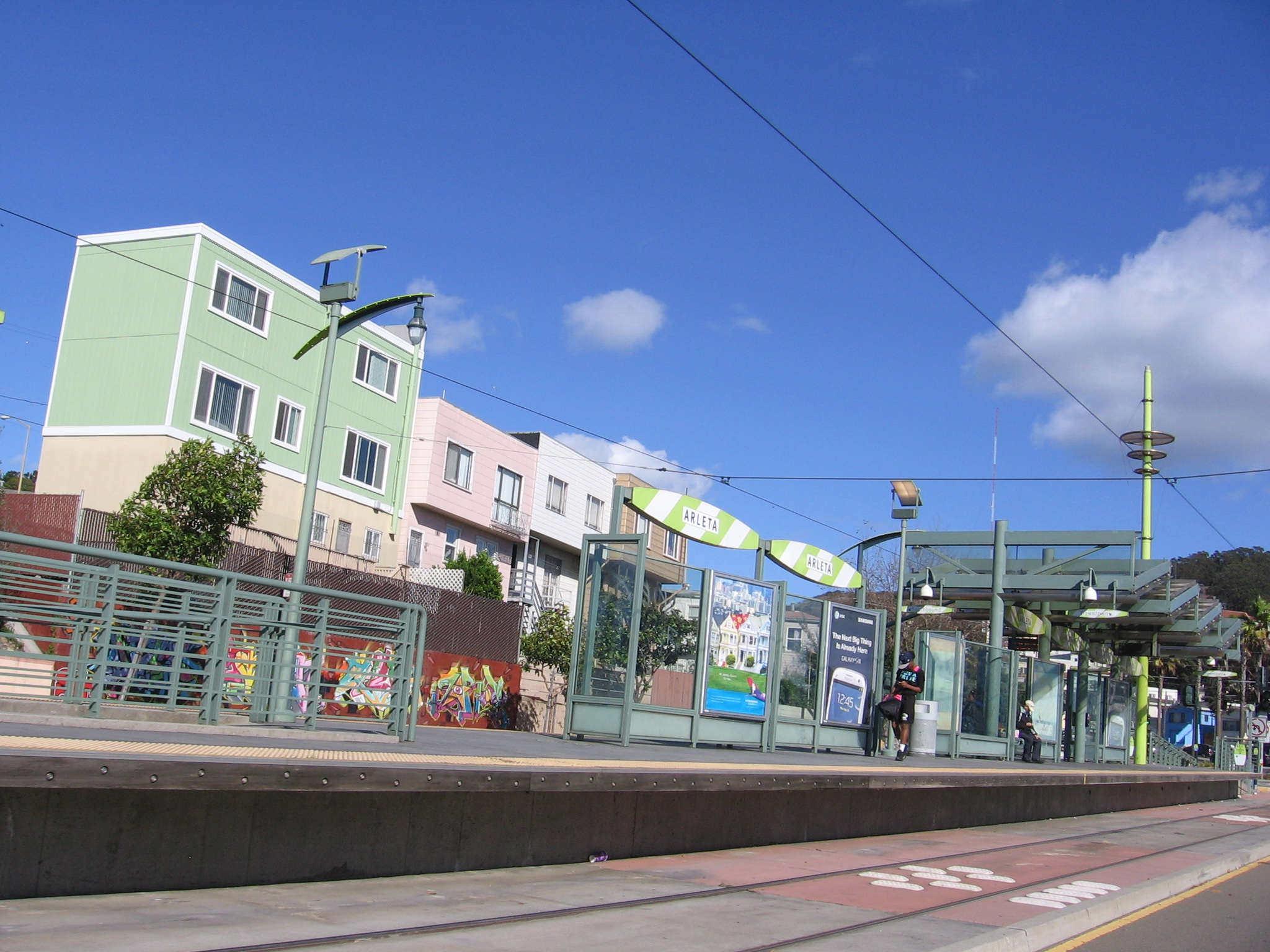
Arleta Station along the T Third Street light rail line, 2012

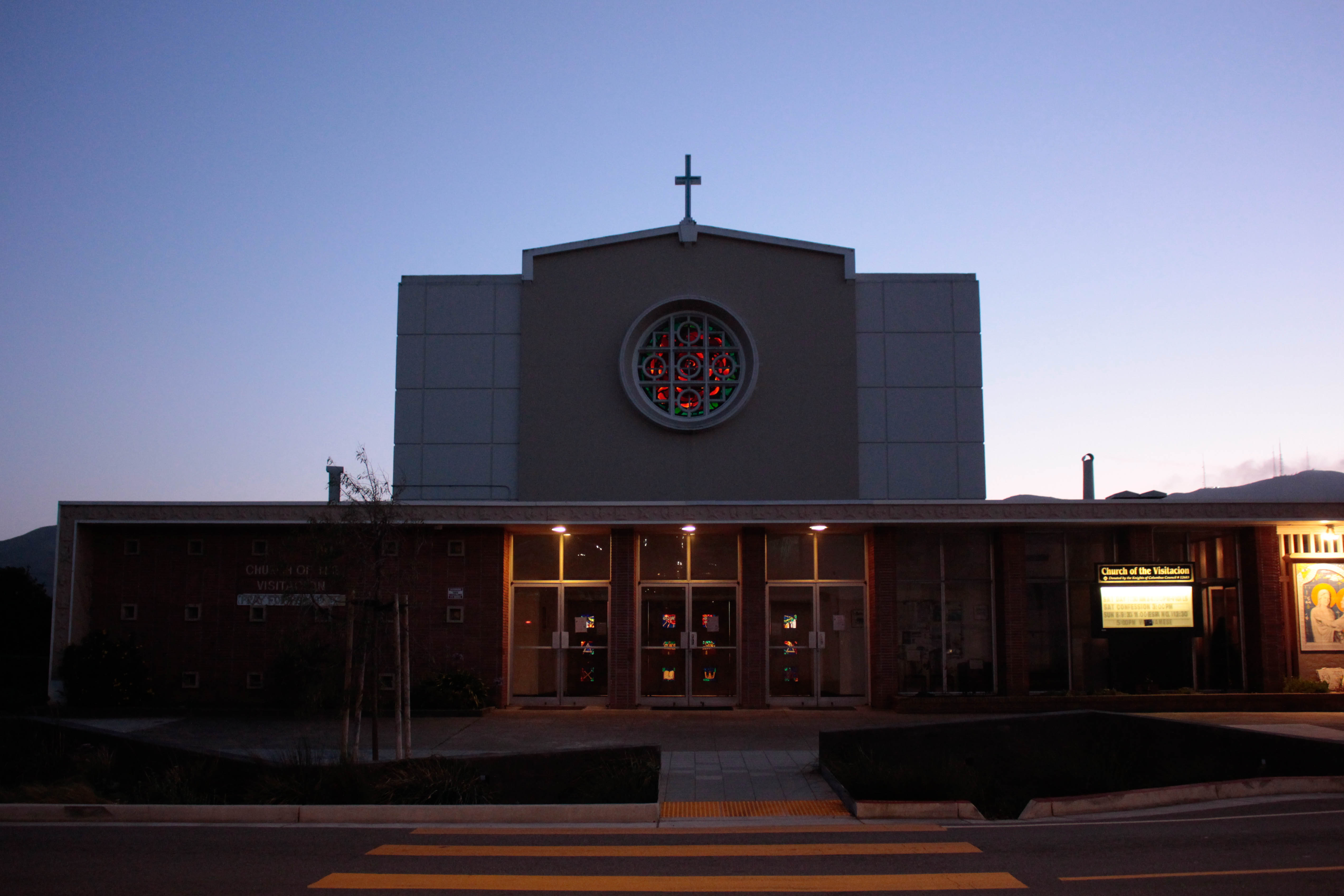
Exterior of the Church of the Visitacion, February 2020
