= Yik Oi Huang =

Chinese-American community leader

- Born: February 15, 1930; Taishan, Guangdong, China
- Died: January 3, 2020 (aged 89); San Francisco, California, U.S.
- Occupation: Community advocate
- Known for: Yik Oi Huang Peace & Friendship Park

Yik Oi Huang (February 15, 1930 – January 3, 2020) was a Chinese-American community advocate in Visitacion Valley, San Francisco. A city park was named in her memory in 2022.

== Biography ==
Huang was born in Taishan, Guangdong, China. She married Ho Wei Huang and had four children. The Huangs moved to the United States in 1986, to be near their daughter and grandchildren there. In San Francisco, she became a naturalized United States citizen, worked as a seamstress and nanny, and bought a home with her family in Visitacion Valley. She was known for doing daily exercises at Visitacion Valley Playground, and as an ambassador for the Visitacion Valley Friendship Club, helping other Chinese immigrant seniors access help with citizenship, food assistance, rental agreements, and emergency preparedness. She was known as Grandma Huang, or Huang PoPo, to the younger people in the neighborhood.

In January 2019, Huang was attacked at the playground while doing her usual exercises. She died from her injuries a year later, at the age of 89, in a long-term care hospital in San Francisco. A teenaged suspect was arrested within days after the event, In November 2025 he was found guilty of her murder and other violent crimes.

== Legacy ==
California State Senator Scott Weiner read Huang's story into the state's legislative record in January 2020. Huang's murder stayed in the news after her death, in connection with Stop Asian Hate rallies in San Francisco and in other American cities. Visitacion Valley Playground was named Yik Oi Huang Peace & Friendship Park in 2022, "as a visible tribute to an Asian immigrant working-class woman". Mayor London Breed spoke at the park's re-dedication in 2024, as did Huang's granddaughter Sasanna Lee, and several other city officials.
