= Liberty Street Historic District =

Liberty Street Historic District may refer to:

- Liberty Street Historic District (San Francisco, California), listed on the National Register of Historic Places (NRHP) in San Francisco, California
- Liberty Street Historic District (Bath, New York), listed on the NRHP in New York

== See also ==
- Liberty Hill Historic District (disambiguation)
