= Liberty Hill Historic District (San Francisco) =

Historic district in San Francisco County, California, U.S.

Coordinates: 37°45′25″N 122°25′20″W

Liberty Hill Historic District Liberty–Hill Historic District
- Historic District
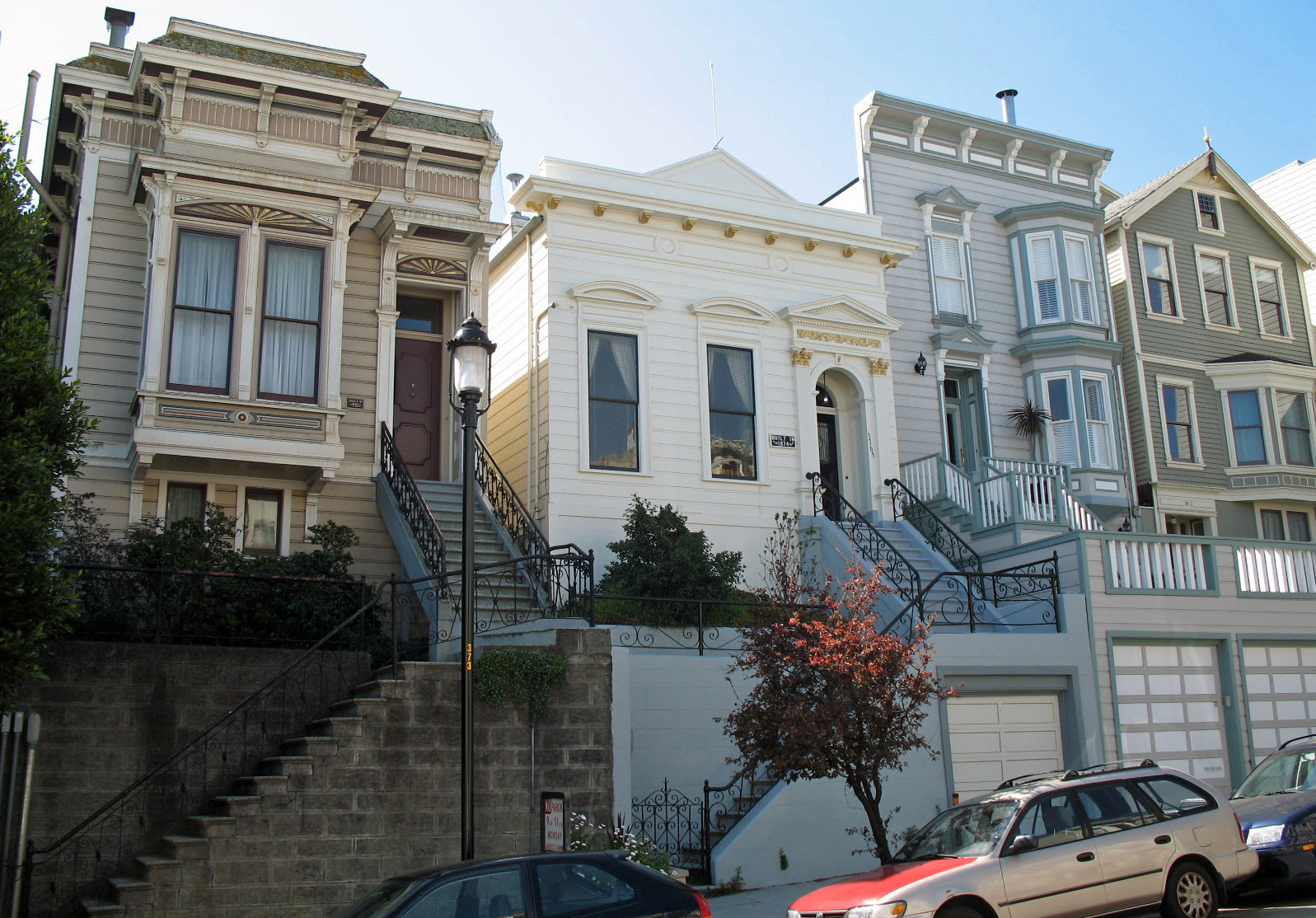
- Image of houses at 3762–3773 20th Street
- Interactive map of Liberty Hill Historic District
- Named for: Liberty Street and Hill Street
- Designated date: October 25, 1985
- Location: Bound by 20th, Mission, Dolores, and 22nd Streets, San Francisco, California, U.S.
- SFDL No.: 5

The Liberty Hill Historic District is a historic district located in the Dolores Heights neighborhood of San Francisco, California, U.S.. It is a residential neighborhood bound by 20th, Mission, Dolores, and 22nd Streets. It is listed as a San Francisco Designated Landmark since October 25, 1985.

It contains the Liberty Street Historic District, a two block area along Liberty Street listed as a California Historical Landmark, and one of the National Register of Historic Places.

== History ==
It is a residential neighborhood bound by 20th Street, Mission Street, Dolores Street, and 22nd Street. The southern boundary is the Yerba Buena Spanish settlement charter line of 1834. The name was derived from a hyphenation of Liberty Street and Hill Street, however over time the hyphen was dropped. It is not particularly steep. The area was built as 19th-century middle class housing, and the houses range in size.

Notable houses in the district include the Marsden Kershaw House (845 Guerrero Street), and the John McMullen House (827 Guerrero Street); both of which are San Francisco Designated Landmarks. A number of homes in the district were designed by prominent architects, including the Newsom Brothers (Samuel Newsom and Joseph Cather Newsom), Albert Pissis, Charles Shaner, William H. Toepke, Charles Havens, and Charles J. Rousseau. People associated with the district include Mark Zuckerberg, John Donald Daly, James Rolph, Jr., Susan B. Anthony, and Lotta Crabtree.

== See also ==
- List of San Francisco Designated Landmarks
