= Liberty Street Historic District (San Francisco, California) =

Historic district in San Francisco County, California, U.S.

- U.S. National Register of Historic Places
- U.S. Historic district
- California Historical Landmark
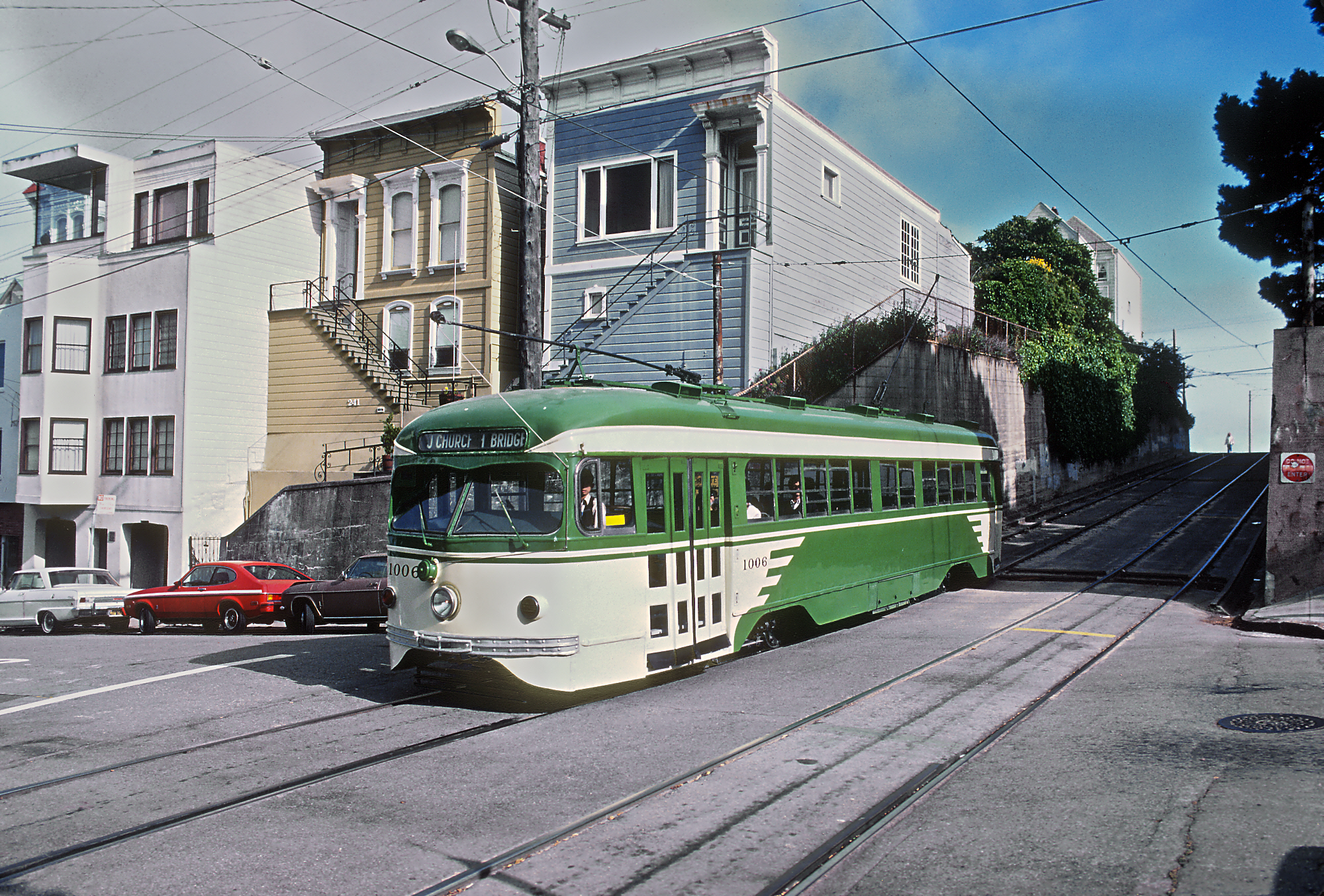
- The J Church Muni crossing Liberty Street, near Dolores Street

- Location within San Francisco County Location within California
- Location: Roughly 15–188 Liberty Street, San Francisco, California, U.S.
- Coordinates: 37°45′28″N 122°25′20″W
- Architectural style: Late 19th And 20th Century Revivals, Late Victorian
- NRHP reference No.: 83001230
- CHISL No.: N1244

Significant dates
- Added to NRHP: September 15, 1983
- Designated CHISL: September 15, 1983

The Liberty Street Historic District is a historic district located in the Dolores Heights neighborhood of San Francisco, California, U.S.. It is a residential area spanning two blocks on Liberty Street and is part of the Liberty Hill Historic District, a city designated landmark district. The J Church Muni light rail crosses the district at the Right Of Way/Liberty station. Liberty Street Historic District is listed as a California Historical Landmark since September 15, 1983; and on the National Register of Historic Places on September 15, 1983, for architecture.

== Location ==
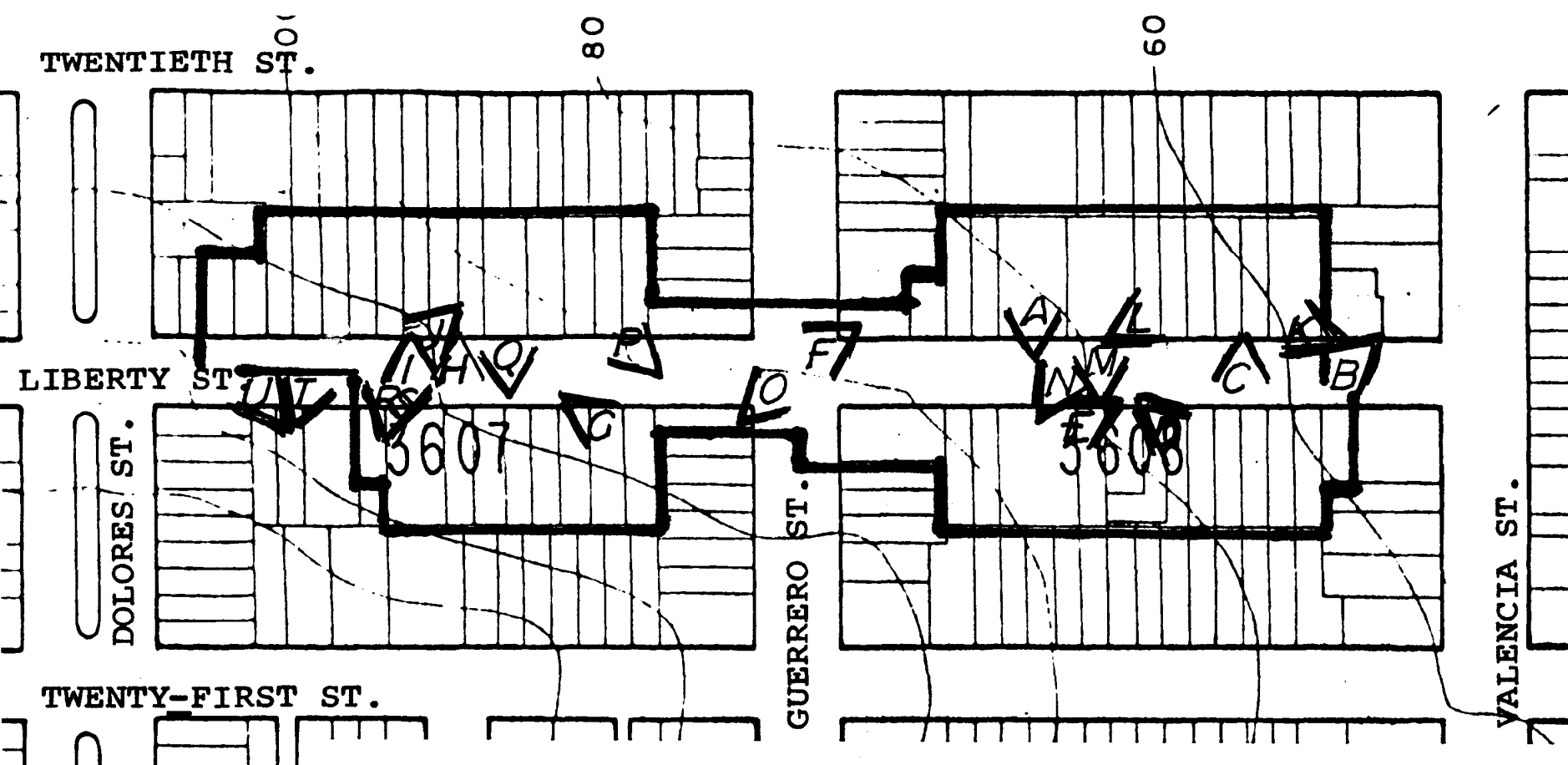
Liberty Street Historic District map

The Liberty Street Historic District, as defined by the National Register of Historic Places, is a residential enclave comprising 51 detached residential buildings along both sides of nearly two city blocks. It should be noted the "Liberty Hill Historic District" (a similar name) has been listed as a San Francisco Designated Landmark since 1972, however it comprises a larger area and contains the Liberty Street Historic District; with 298 residential buildings within a 10 city block area as defined by the city.

== About ==
The land for the site slopes up steeply, it is located immediately west of San Francisco's Mission District flatlands, and a stream is said to run down the line of the street in a brick culvert. All of the contributing buildings to the historic district are narrow residential structures, are generally two stories tall, and most buildings have corniced false fronts masking gable roofs.

The Liberty Street Historic District is significant as a quiet residential enclave containing a capsule history of middle-class urban housing over a 45-year period. One third of houses are Italianate-style built in the 1860s and 1870s. Other architecture styles found in the Liberty Street Historic District include seven Stick style (and Stick-Eastlake style) houses built in the 1880s, six Queen Anne style houses built in the 1890s, and five duplex buildings in local vernacular versions of Classical revival built in the early 20th-century.

== See also ==
- California Historical Landmarks in San Francisco County, California
- National Register of Historic Places listings in San Francisco
