= 49-Mile Scenic Drive =

Scenic road tour in San Francisco, California

49-Mile Scenic Drive
- 49-Mile Scenic Drive highlighted in red

Route information
- Maintained by San Francisco DPW
- Length: 48.8 mi (78.5 km)
- Existed: September 14, 1938–April 2020

Major junctions
- Loop around San Francisco
- US 101 in Cathedral Hill; US 101 / SR 1 in the Presidio; SR 35 near Golden Gate Park; I-280 near Islais Creek

Location
- Country: United States
- State: California
- County: San Francisco

Highway system
- County routes in California
- Streets in San Francisco

The 49-Mile Scenic Drive is a historic scenic road tour highlighting much of San Francisco, California. It was created in 1938 by the San Francisco Down Town Association to showcase the city's major attractions and natural beauty during the 1939 Golden Gate International Exposition.

Originally beginning at San Francisco City Hall and ending on Treasure Island, the route has been modified several times since. By 1999, the route formed a loop proceeding counterclockwise from Civic Center Plaza, and its length was closer to 48.8 miles (78.5 km). Modern signage for the route, depicting a seagull in profile on a sky blue background, was erected in 1954 and is maintained by the San Francisco Department of Parking and Traffic. Owing variously to its length, its labyrinthine route, and the difficulty of driving through a bustling city, the drive remained relatively unpopular with tourists and locals alike. Permanent closures to vehicular traffic on John F. Kennedy Drive in Golden Gate Park and on Great Highway in the 2020s made the loop discontinuous.

In 2019, the San Francisco Chronicle proposed a non-driving alternative that it called the 49-Mile Scenic Route.

== Route description ==
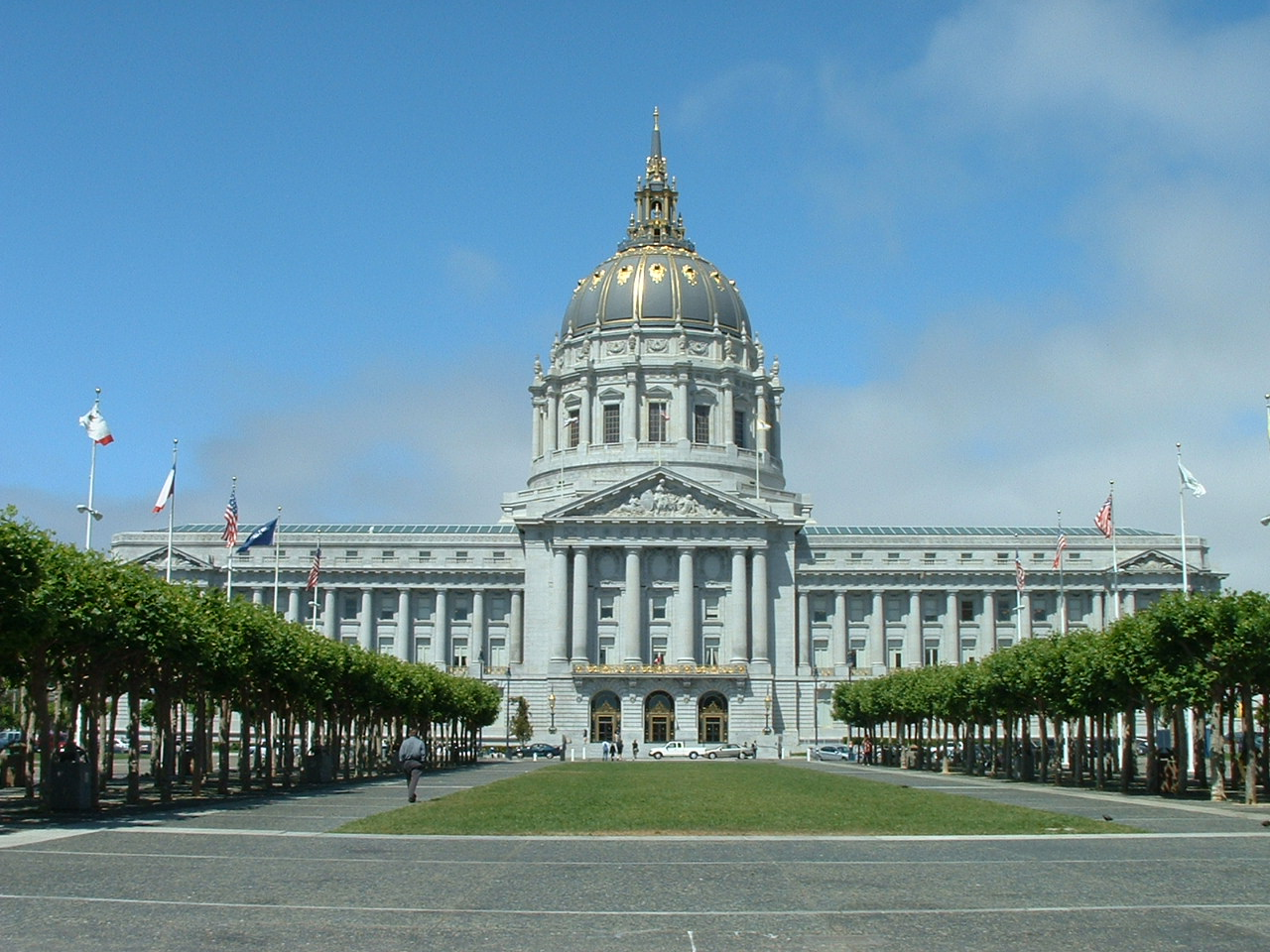
San Francisco City Hall is, since 1999, both the starting and the ending route marker.

The drive begins on Polk Street opposite San Francisco City Hall. Circling Civic Center Plaza and passing Bill Graham Civic Auditorium, the San Francisco Public Library's main branch, and the Asian Art Museum, the route continues north along Larkin Street through Little Saigon before turning onto Geary Boulevard and proceeding west up Cathedral Hill. After entering Japantown, the drive turns north onto Webster Street before immediately returning east along Post Street, where it continues past Japan Center, Lower Nob Hill, and Union Square.

At Grant Avenue, the route again turns north and enters Chinatown through its Dragon Gate. Drivers are soon directed onto California Street and up Nob Hill, passing its landmark hotels. Turning north at Grace Cathedral, the route then directs drivers east onto Washington Street, passing the San Francisco Cable Car Museum, then south onto Powell Street for one block before descending east along Clay Street, back into Chinatown. At Portsmouth Square, the route proceeds north along Kearny Street for two blocks and turns northwest onto Columbus Avenue, entering North Beach. After passing City Lights Bookstore and turning onto Grant Avenue once more, the route travels for six blocks up Telegraph Hill before turning west onto Lombard Street near Coit Tower. Passing the Joe DiMaggio Playground, the route turns north toward Fisherman's Wharf on Mason Street.

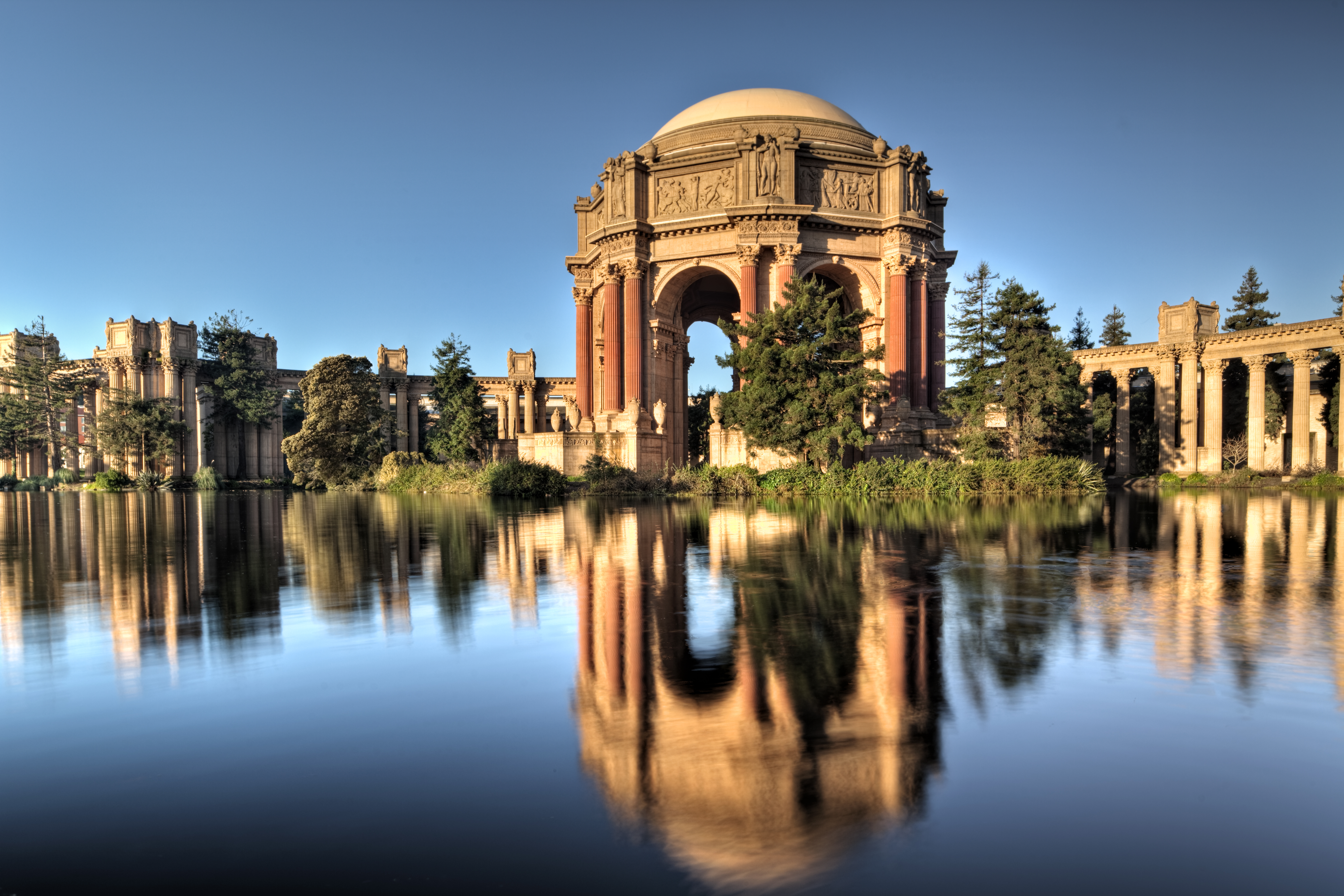
The Palace of Fine Arts in the Marina District

At Jefferson Street, the route proceeds alongside the waterfront—passing Aquatic Park and the San Francisco Maritime Museum with several quick turns heading into the Marina District near Fort Mason. Over the next few miles, the route passes nearly all of San Francisco's Golden Gate National Recreation Area locations. The route detours through the Marina Green parking lot and takes a path of residential streets to the Palace of Fine Arts, the most prominent remaining structure from the 1915 Panama–Pacific International Exposition. Continuing for a few blocks each on Baker, Bay, Broderick, Chestnut, and Lyon streets, the route enters the Presidio at Lombard Street.

At 8.6 miles (13.8 km), the route passes the Letterman Digital Arts Center, proceeds onto Presidio Boulevard, and continues onto Lincoln Boulevard. The route detours through the Presidio's Main Post before returning to Lincoln Boulevard near San Francisco National Cemetery. Passing above Crissy Field and Fort Point, under the U.S. Highway 101 (US 101) approach to the Golden Gate Bridge, and above Baker Beach, the route exits the Presidio into Sea Cliff. Continuing along El Camino del Mar into Lincoln Park, the route passes the Legion of Honor and exits the park into the Richmond District. Turning westward onto Geary Boulevard, drivers proceed several blocks and continue onto Point Lobos Avenue, soon reaching the Sutro Baths and Cliff House.

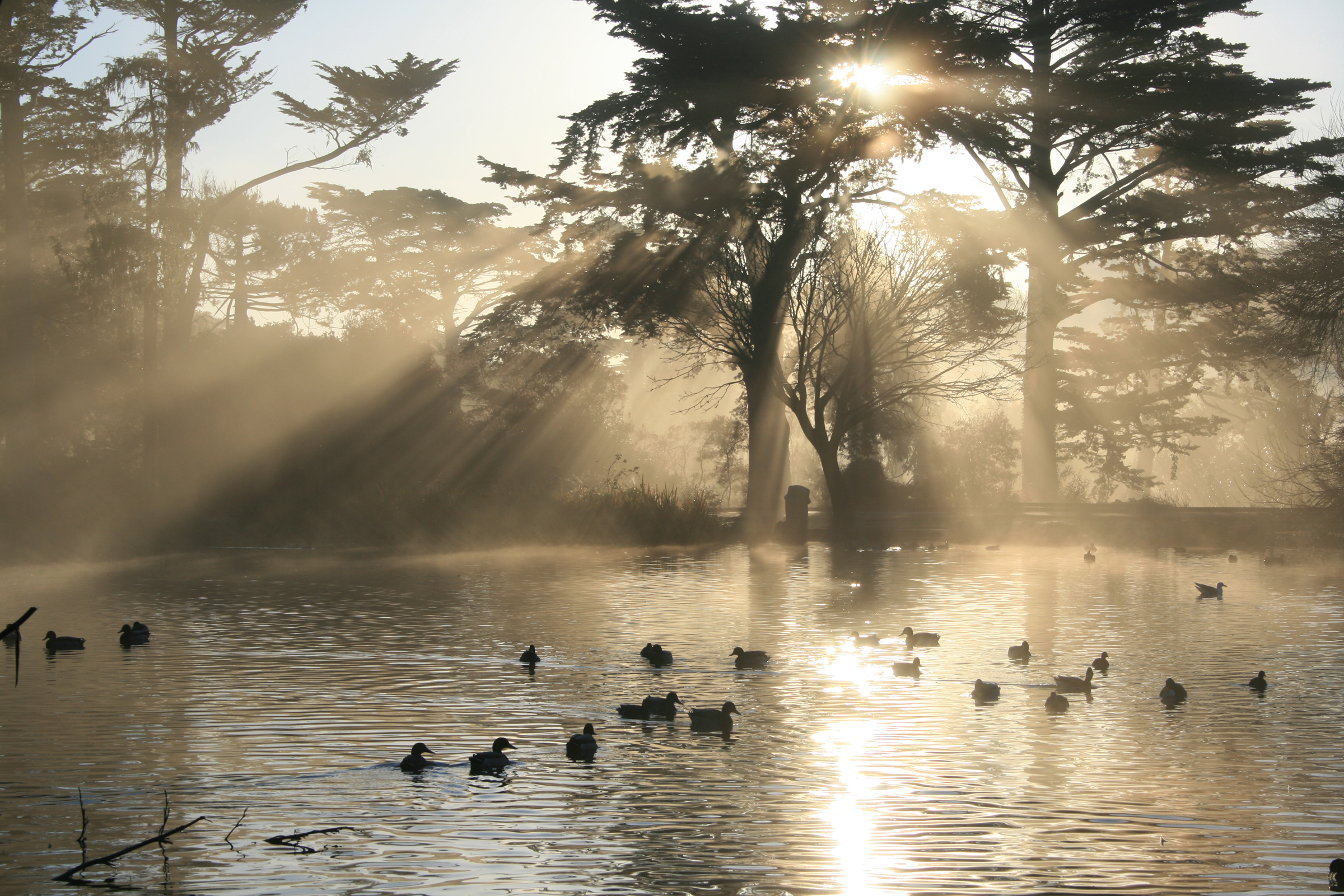
Stow Lake in Golden Gate Park

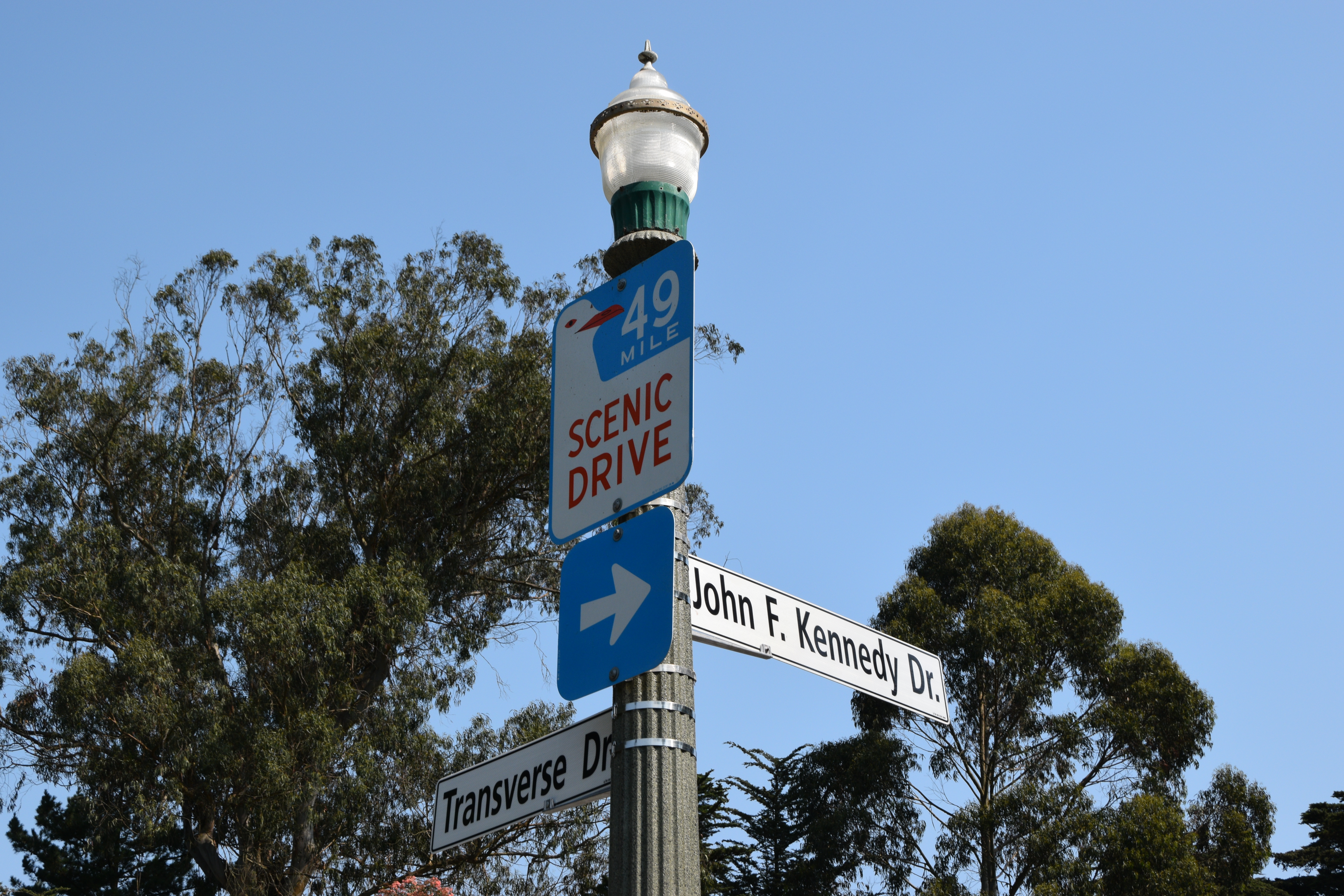
Street sign at the corner of John F. Kennedy Dr. and Transverse Dr. with a 49 Mile Scenic Drive sign

At 15.2 miles (24.5 km), the route proceeds due south along the city's Pacific coast on Great Highway, passing Ocean Beach, the edge of Golden Gate Park, the San Francisco Zoo, and skirting Lake Merced before returning north on Lake Merced Boulevard past San Francisco State University and continuing through the Sunset District along Sunset Boulevard. The route then enters Golden Gate Park and winds through it for about 5 miles (8.0 km)—circling Stow Lake; passing the Japanese Tea Garden, San Francisco Botanical Garden, and California Academy of Sciences; turning at the AIDS Memorial Grove; and exiting the park's East Portal at Stanyan Street.

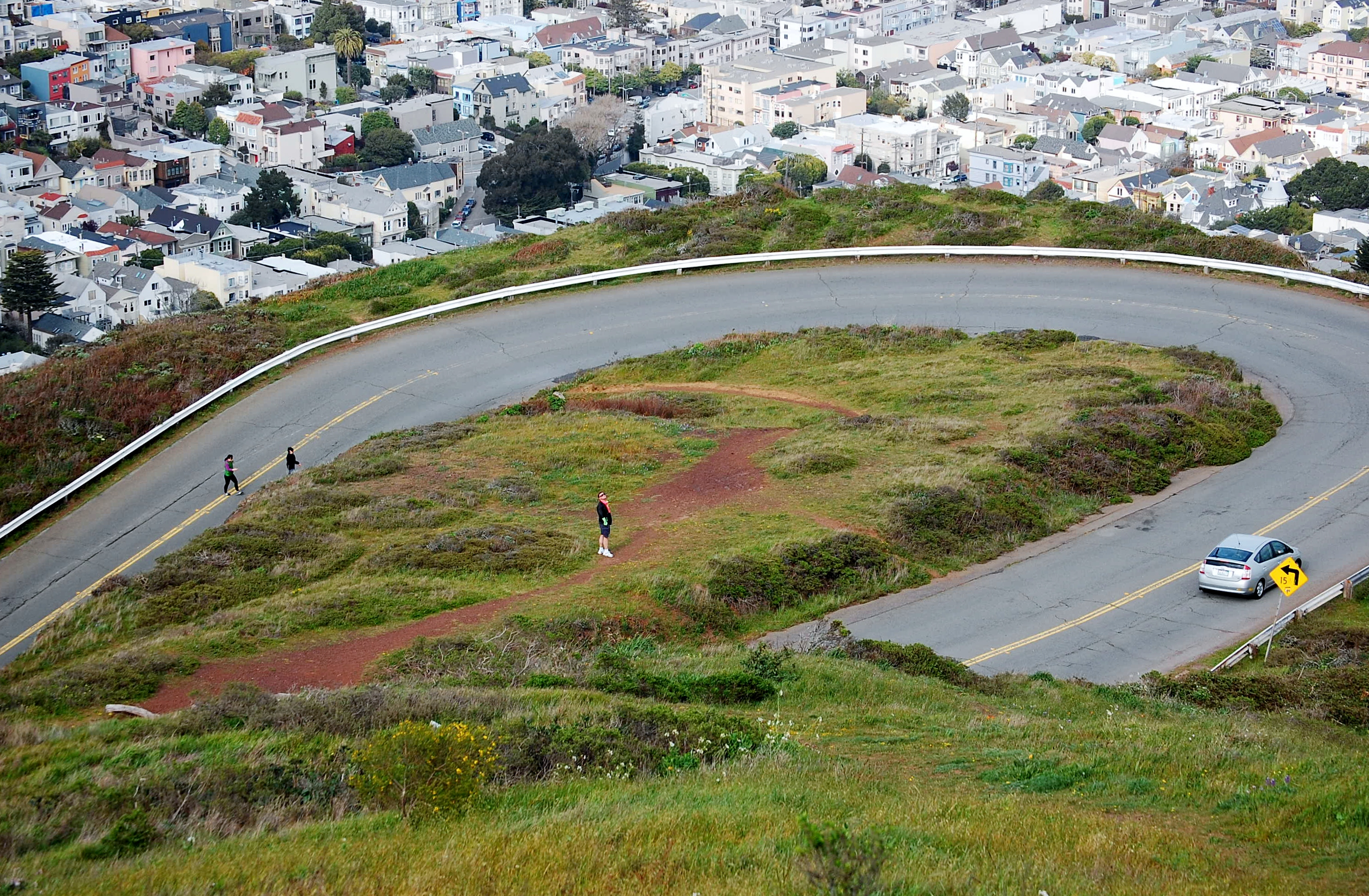
The route along its descent from Twin Peaks

Briefly skirting the Haight-Ashbury and Cole Valley neighborhoods, the route ascends Parnassus Street and passes the University of California, San Francisco's main campus. Turning south onto 7th Avenue in the Inner Sunset, the route curves around Mount Sutro and the Laguna Honda Reservoir before turning east and climbing Twin Peaks. From Twin Peaks Boulevard, drivers are directed into the north peak's parking area and offered unobstructed views of the city below. The route then descends into Corona Heights—built to take full advantage of the views at this height. Winding its way down the hill, the route takes drivers past the Randall Museum before descending east along 14th Street into San Francisco's prominent gay neighborhood, The Castro. Now 36.6 miles (58.9 km) into the drive, the route turns southward along tree-lined Dolores Street, passing Mission San Francisco de Asís and Mission Dolores Park while splitting the Castro, Mission District, and Noe Valley en route to Cesar Chavez Street. At Cesar Chavez Street, the route continues east through Potrero Hill before abruptly directing drivers onto northbound I-280.

After about 40 miles (64 km) of surface streets, the route travels along I-280 for the final 1.5 miles (2.4 km) of that freeway, exiting near Mission Bay and Oracle Park. It winds along The Embarcadero and underneath the San Francisco–Oakland Bay Bridge—once the final leg of the route before its Treasure Island terminus. At Market Street, the route crosses in front of the Ferry Building and shortly thereafter turns westward along Washington Street to enter the Financial District. Proceeding south on the often-congested Battery Street, the route crosses Market Street and enters the SoMA neighborhood on 1st Street. Turning again at Howard Street, the route passes the SFMOMA, Yerba Buena Gardens, and Moscone Center before making its final turn onto 9th Street, crossing Market once more, and returning to Civic Center Plaza. The route ends where it began, in front of City Hall, after traveling 46.3 miles (74.5 km).

== History ==
=== World's Fair attraction ===
In the late 1930s, residents of San Francisco and the greater Bay Area celebrated the completion of both the Golden Gate Bridge and San Francisco–Oakland Bay Bridge. In July 1938, President Franklin D. Roosevelt was given a vehicular tour of the city, including its two bridges, with Senator William Gibbs McAdoo and Mayor Angelo Joseph Rossi before speaking at the Treasure Island fairgrounds, site of the Golden Gate International Exposition of 1939–40. Later that year, the San Francisco Down Town Association devised a route from behind City Hall to Treasure Island that was originally titled the "50-Mile Scenic Drive", marking the way with blue and gold triangular signs. The name was changed shortly thereafter—probably with marketing intentions—to reflect San Francisco's approximate area (46.9 square miles (121 km^{2})) and reference the California Gold Rush of 1849, from which the term "forty-niner" originates. The Down Town Association produced brochures highlighting the scenic drive for tourists.

On September 14, 1938, the 49-Mile Scenic Drive was officially opened by Douglas Corrigan, who had achieved fame (and his nickname, "Wrong Way") earlier in 1938 for claiming to fly from New York City to Los Angeles but ending up in Dublin. Corrigan drove at least part of the route in reverse on that day.

=== Reroutings and a new sign ===
After the Golden Gate International Exposition was closed in 1940, control of Treasure Island was transferred to the U.S. Navy, and the drive was rerouted for the first time. During World War II, civilian access to the Presidio was closed, the route effectively closing along with it. In 1947, the drive reopened with an expanded southeastern segment, which now continued south past Mission San Francisco de Asís to Excelsior, McLaren Park, and Visitacion Valley before returning via the Bayshore Freeway and Bryant Street to The Embarcadero.

Today, portions of the route are marked by these signs chosen in a 1954 contest.

In 1954, the Down Town Association held a contest to design a new sign to mark the route, offering the winner a $100 prize. Local artist Rex May submitted the winning entry, a seagull in profile on a sky blue background with white and orange text. The signs have proved a popular target for theft and many portions of the route are unsigned. The San Francisco Department of Parking and Traffic, which manages the signs, attempts to replace them when they are informed.

By 1976, the drive had been rerouted once more. The initial segment now moved west from Van Ness Avenue through Japantown, showcasing the recently completed Japan Center. A more complex loop through Chinatown included a trip up Nob Hill. A formalized detour to Fort Point was indicated, and the route now turned in Lincoln Park to reach Cliff House via Geary Boulevard instead of Fort Miley. A longer route through Golden Gate Park now included a circle of Stow Lake from the north, and the southeastern loop to Visitacion Valley was truncated and replaced by a turn on Army Street (Cesar Chavez). Finally, a new segment on Interstate 280 allowed the drive to return to The Embarcadero.

In 1999, the route was again modified. Changes included beginning at Civic Center Plaza rather than on Van Ness Avenue, removing the former detour to Coit Tower, and traveling on Howard Street instead of Market Street at the end of the route.

In April of 2020, John F. Kennedy Drive in Golden Gate Park was closed to vehicular traffic. In 2022, the San Francisco Board of Supervisors voted to permanently keep the 1.5-mile stretch of JFK Drive closed to vehicles, making it a permanent car-free route known as the JFK Promenade.

On March 14, 2025, a two-mile stretch of Great Highway along the Pacific Ocean was closed to traffic permanently.

With the road closures in 2020 and 2025, and with no alternative routes either planned or proposed by the San Francisco Department of Public Works, the agency unofficially but effectively decommissioned the Scenic Drive.

== 49-Mile Scenic Route ==
The 49-Mile Scenic Route is a modern reimagining of San Francisco's historic 49-Mile Scenic Drive, designed to offer a walkable, bikeable, and transit-friendly exploration of the city's diverse neighborhoods and landmarks. Initiated by San Francisco Chronicle reporters Heather Knight and Peter Hartlaub in 2019, this updated route emphasizes accessibility and inclusivity, moving away from the car-centric approach of the original drive. It is a scenic tour of San Francisco designed to be accessible to non-drivers. It is an alternative to the 49-Mile Scenic Drive.

In 2019, Peter Hartlaub and Heather Knight of the San Francisco Chronicle wrote a series of articles about a proposed new scenic route. They started by doing the existing scenic drive via a variety of non-car modes of transport to figure out what works when not driving. After publishing their initial experience, Chronicle readers were invited to take a survey about the proposed scenic route.

The route measures just over 49 miles, and adds neighborhoods such as Ingleside, The Bayview, and Bernal Heights, as well as multiple parks. The scenic route also highlights independent bookstores, neighborhood theaters, museums, art galleries, and restaurants.

While the scenic drive started at City Hall, the scenic route starts at the San Francisco Chronicle building at 5th and Mission. Like the drive, the route proceeds counterclockwise around the city. The section from the Financial District to the entrance of the Presidio is the same on both the scenic route and the scenic drive. The route leaves off some parts of the Richmond District and Sea Cliff.

== See also ==
- Barbary Coast Trail
