= Edgehill Mountain =

Hill in San Francisco, California, United States

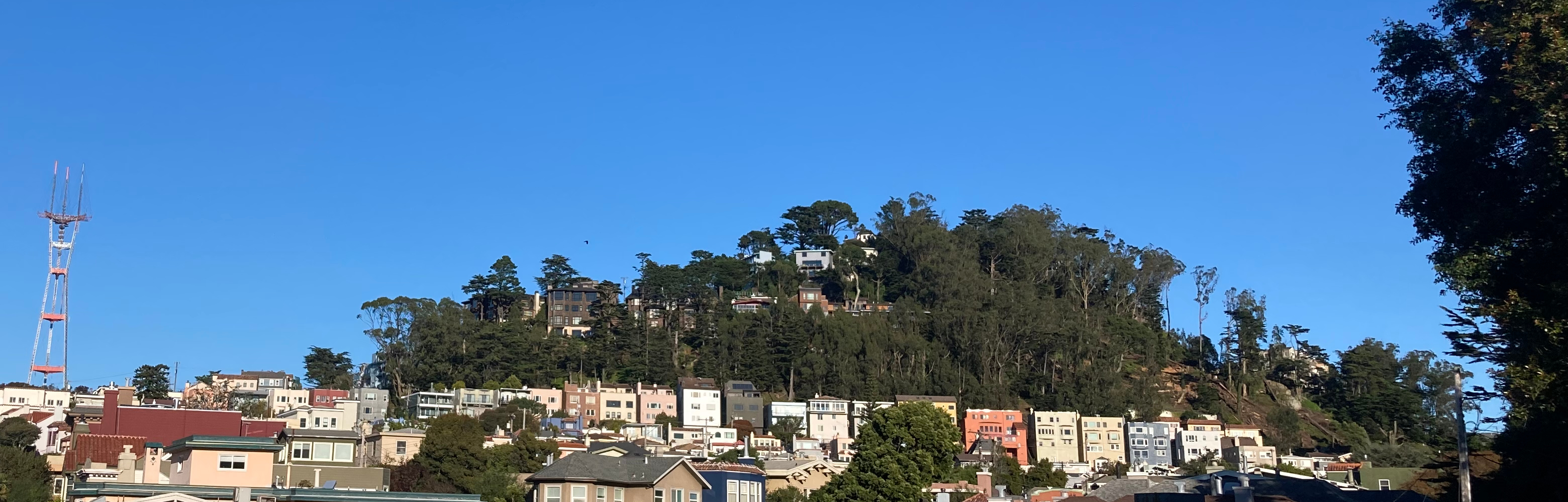

Highest point
- Elevation: 734 ft (224 m)
- Coordinates: 37°44′34″N 122°27′33″W

Geography
- Location within San Francisco County
- Location: San Francisco, California, U.S.
- Topo map: USGS San Francisco South

Climbing
- Easiest route: Hike

Edgehill Mountain Park
- Interactive map of Edgehill Mountain Park
- Type: Municipal (San Francisco)
- Location: San Francisco
- Area: 38 acres (15 ha)
- Created: 1985

Edgehill Mountain is one of the 46 hills of the City and County of San Francisco, California, located in the United States of America. This hill is part of a western greenbelt that connects Mount Davidson, Hawk Hill, Twin Peaks, and the area around Laguna Honda Reservoir, which all run on the crest of a ridge of hill tops through the center of the city. The neighborhood surrounding the hill boasts a small park by the same name.

== History ==
The area of land comprising the hill top was once part of Adolph Sutro's San Miguel Ranch. This property was sold after Sutro's death in 1898. This area of land then became one of the city's first subdivisions, known as Claremont Court, after which houses were built on the mountain's western and southern slopes. Major problems with building on this land began in 1952 and 1953 when winter rains caused part of Edgehill Way, and one home on it, to slide down the mountain side. Edgehill Mountain Park was established in 1985 when the city purchased 1 acre (0.4 ha) of the mountain's undeveloped, western slope and designated the area an Open Space Park. One of the hill's slopes located above some newly constructed homes collapsed during a rainstorm in 1997, causing mud and rock to cascade onto the houses below.
