= Bob Marshall (California politician) =

Mayor of San Bruno, California
- In office April 1980 – November 1991
- Preceded by: ?
- Succeeded by: ?

Personal details
- Born: June 9, 1934 San Francisco, California
- Died: May 8, 2012 (aged 77) Burlingame, California
- Spouse: Paula Marshall
- Children: 4 (Bob Jr., Anne, Stephan, John)
- Parent(s): Al Marshall; Lorene Marshall

Robert "Bob" Marshall Sr. (June 9, 1934 – May 8, 2012) was an American politician and real estate agent. Marshall served as the Mayor of San Bruno, California, for several terms from April 1980 to November 1991. His longtime involvement in San Bruno politics and the regional real estate market earned him the nickname, "Mr. San Bruno."

Marshall was born in San Francisco, California, on June 9, 1934. He attended Corpus Christi elementary school and graduated from Sacred Heart Cathedral Preparatory, a Catholic secondary school located in San Francisco's Cathedral Hill neighborhood. He joined the U.S. Army and was stationed in Korea. Marshall moved to San Bruno, California, in 1959 and opened his real estate company, Marshall Realty, that same year. In addition to his residence in San Bruno, he had a second home in St. Helena, California.

Marshall served on the San Bruno city council for twelve years. In 1980, he began his first term as Mayor of San Bruno. During his tenure, Marshall oversaw the city's efforts to construct the senior center, which opened in 1990, earning the facility the nickname "The House that Bob Built." Marshall is also credited with establishing San Bruno's sister city agreement with Narita, Japan, in 1990. He remained in the mayor's office until November 1991.

Outside politics he was named a Realtor Emeritus with the National Association of Realtors. Marshall was a founding member of the Peninsula Bank of Commerce and former President of the North County Board of Realtors and the San Bruno Lions Club.

Marshall suffered injuries from a fall on March 30, 2012. He died from complications of the accident on May 8, 2012, at Peninsula Medical Center in Burlingame, California, at the age of 77. He was survived by his wife of 54 years, Paula, and their four children. His funeral was held at St. Robert's Catholic Church in San Bruno.
