= SHCP =

SHCP may mean:

- Sacred Heart Cathedral Preparatory, a co-ed Catholic school in San Francisco, California, United States
- Secretaría de Hacienda y Crédito Público, Mexico's Secretariat of Finance and Public Credit
