= List of hills in San Francisco =

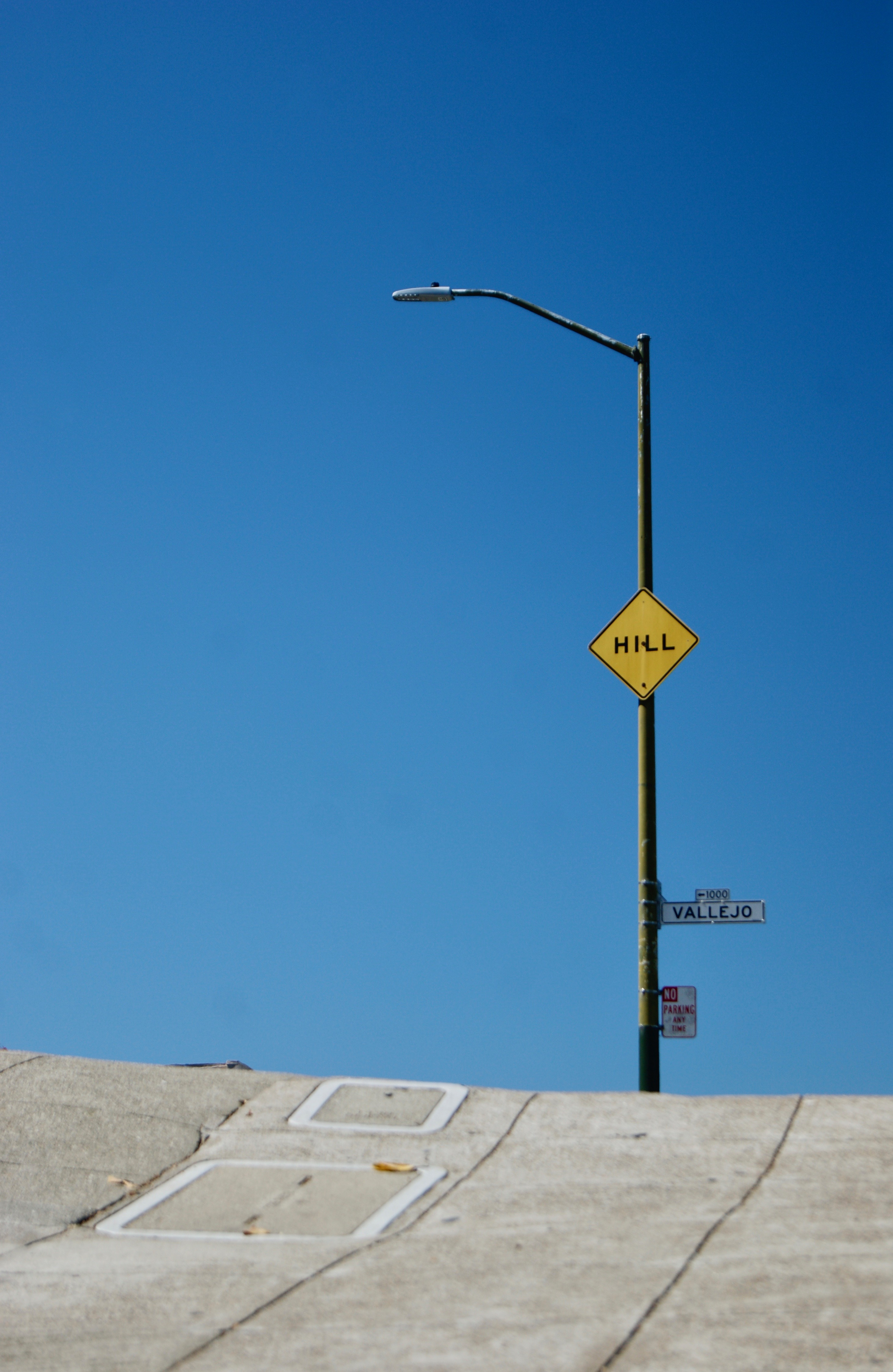
Steep hills are a major feature of San Francisco's geography, with strong impacts on transportation, building and urban planning. Here, a sign warns drivers of a steep slope on Taylor Street.

This is a list of the hills in San Francisco, California.

== Prior lists ==
Several cities claim to have been built on seven hills. Seven of the city's most well-known hills, sometimes referred to collectively as the "Seven Hills of San Francisco," include Telegraph Hill, Nob Hill, Russian Hill, Rincon Hill, Twin Peaks, Mount Davidson and Lone Mountain or Mount Sutro.

The origin of most longer lists of San Francisco hills is Hills of San Francisco, a compilation of 42 San Francisco Chronicle columns, each describing one of the city's hills. The "Hills" chapter of Gladys Hansen's San Francisco Almanac repeated the list given in Hills of San Francisco and added the then-recently-named Cathedral Hill for a total of 43, but the "Places" chapter listed many additional hills. More recent lists include more hills, some lesser-known, some not on the mainland, and some without names.

== Map ==
Map of the 42 hills listed in order from Hills of San Francisco

== Hills ==
Name	Height	Notes
Alamo Heights	225 ft (69 m)	Alamo Hill
Anza Vista	260 ft (79 m)	
Athens Street	612 ft (187 m)	
Bernal Heights	433 ft (132 m)	
Buena Vista Heights	569 ft (173 m)	
Bayview Hill (Candlestick Hill)	500 ft (152 m)	Bay View Park
Billy Goat Hill	354 ft (108 m)	
Castro Hill	407 ft (124 m)	
Cathedral Hill	206 ft (63 m)	
City College Hill (Cloud Hill)	350 ft (107 m)	
College Hill (San Francisco)	200 ft (61 m)	
Corona Heights	510 ft (155 m)	
Dolores Heights (Liberty Hill)	360 ft (110 m)	
Edgehill Mountain	725 ft (221 m)	Mountain is northwest of Mt Davidson; the summit is ringed by Edgehill Way (in the backyard of a personal residence)
Excelsior Heights	315 ft (96 m)	
Forest Hill	800 ft (244 m)	Top of the hill is considered to be the west end of Mendosa Avenue; there are two water tanks and a broadcast tower at the summit - behind a secured gate
Gold Mine Hill	679 ft (207 m)	Diamond Heights
Grand View Hill	666 ft (203 m)	Grandview Park; Golden Gate Heights
Heidelberg Hill	250 ft (76 m)	Golden Gate Park
Holly Park Hill	274 ft (84 m)	Holly Park near Bernal Heights
Hunters Point Ridge	275 ft (84 m)	
Irish Hill	250 ft (76 m)	
Larsen Peak	725 ft (221 m)	Sunset Heights Park; Golden Gate Heights
Laurel Hill	264 ft (80 m)	
Lincoln Heights	380 ft (116 m)	Northwestern corner of the Richmond District, including the Legion of Honor
Lone Mountain	448 ft (137 m)	
McLaren Ridge	515 ft (157 m)	
Merced Heights	500 ft (152 m)	Shields Orizaba Rocky Outcrop
Mint Hill	157 ft (48 m)	
Mount Davidson	925 ft (282 m)	Miraloma Park, Sherwood Forest
Mount Olympus	570 ft (174 m)	
Mount St. Joseph	250 ft (76 m)	
Mount Sutro	911 ft (278 m)	
Nob Hill	376 ft (115 m)	
Pacific Heights	370 ft (113 m)	Lafayette Park, Lafayette Square, Lafayette Heights
Parnassus Heights	400 ft (122 m)	
Potrero Hill	300 ft (91 m)	
Presidio Heights	370 ft (113 m)	
Red Rock Hill	689 ft (210 m)	Diamond Heights
Rincon Hill	100 ft (30 m)	Top of the hill is considered to be near First & Harrison
Russian Hill	294 ft (90 m)	
Silver Terrace	275 ft (84 m)	South end of the city
Strawberry Hill	412 ft (126 m)	Golden Gate Park, ringed by Blue Heron Lake (formerly Stow Lake)
Sutro Heights	200 ft (61 m)	
Tank Hill	650 ft (198 m)	Clarendon Heights
Telegraph Hill	284 ft (87 m)	
Twin Peaks North (Eureka Peak)	904 ft (276 m)	
Twin Peaks South (Noe Peak)	910 ft (277 m)	
University Mound	265 ft (81 m)	
Washington Heights	260 ft (79 m)	

== See also ==
- List of San Francisco placename etymologies
- List of summits of the San Francisco Bay Area
- Neighborhoods in San Francisco
- Seven hills (disambiguation)
