= Lone Mountain (California) =

Neighborhood in San Francisco

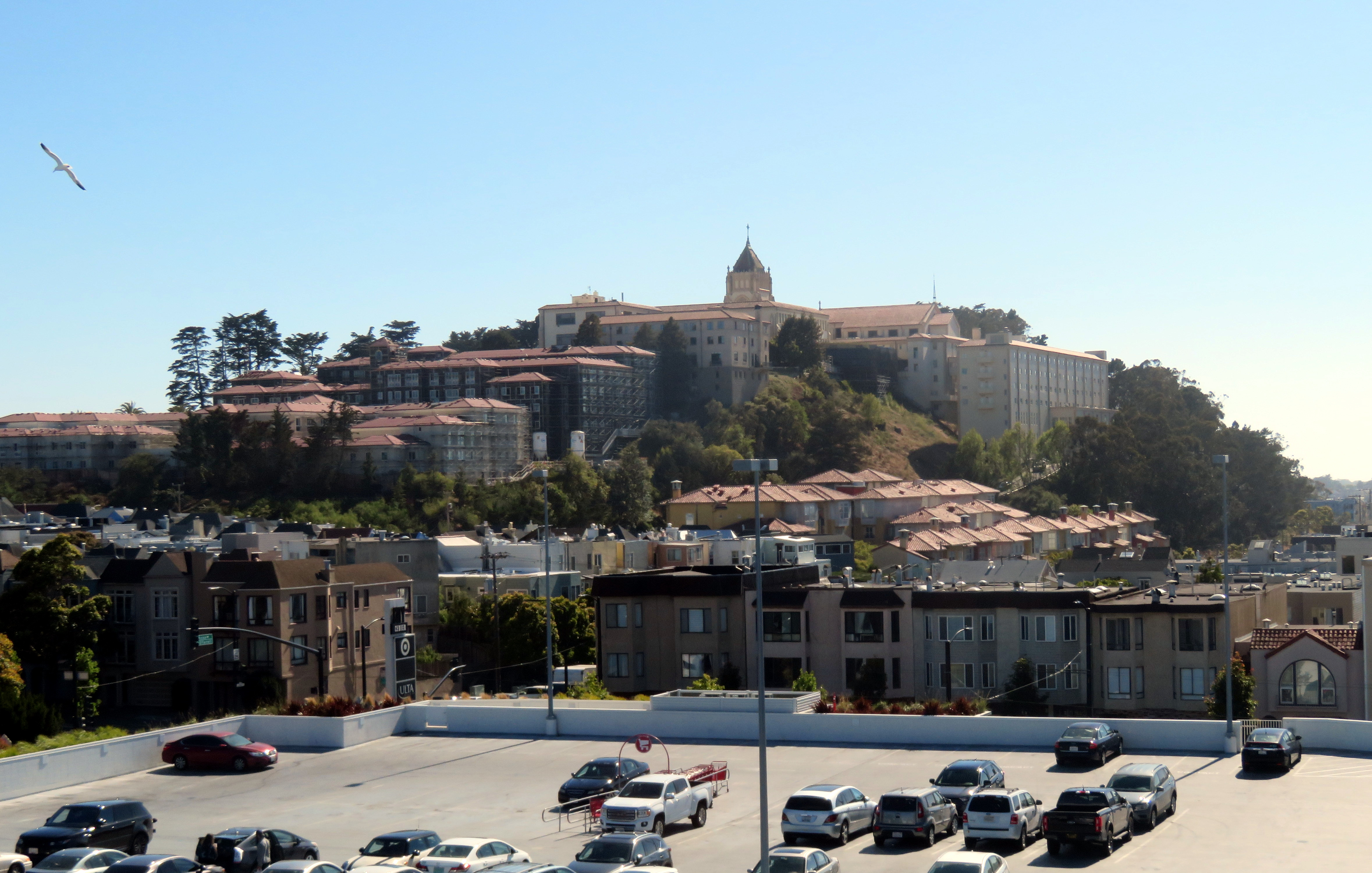
- Lone Mountain from the northeast in 2020

Highest point
- Elevation: 421 ft (128 m) NAVD 88
- Coordinates: 37°46′45″N 122°27′07″W

Geography
- Location within San Francisco County
- Location: San Francisco, California
- Topo map: USGS San Francisco North

Lone Mountain is a neighborhood and a historic hill in west-central San Francisco, California. It is the present site of the northern half of the University of San Francisco's main campus. It was once the location of the Lone Mountain Cemetery, a complex encompassing the Laurel Hill, Calvary, Masonic and Odd Fellows Cemeteries.

== History ==
Lone Mountain is one of San Francisco's historic hills. The Spanish name for Lone Mountain was El Divisadero, from the Spanish divisadero, which means a point from which one can look far.

The Lone Mountain Cemetery was opened on May 30, 1854. In 1867, the cemetery was renamed Laurel Hill Cemetery. After decades of litigation and public debate, the gravesite remains were all moved, primarily to Cypress Lawn Memorial Park in the city of Colma, immediately south of San Francisco.

Lone Mountain College (formerly Sacred Heart Academy and San Francisco College for Women) was founded in 1898, and changed leadership and ownership many times before becoming part of USF in 1978. The Lone Mountain area is also known as "University Terrace" because of the terraces that connect the two USF campuses.

Lone Mountain history

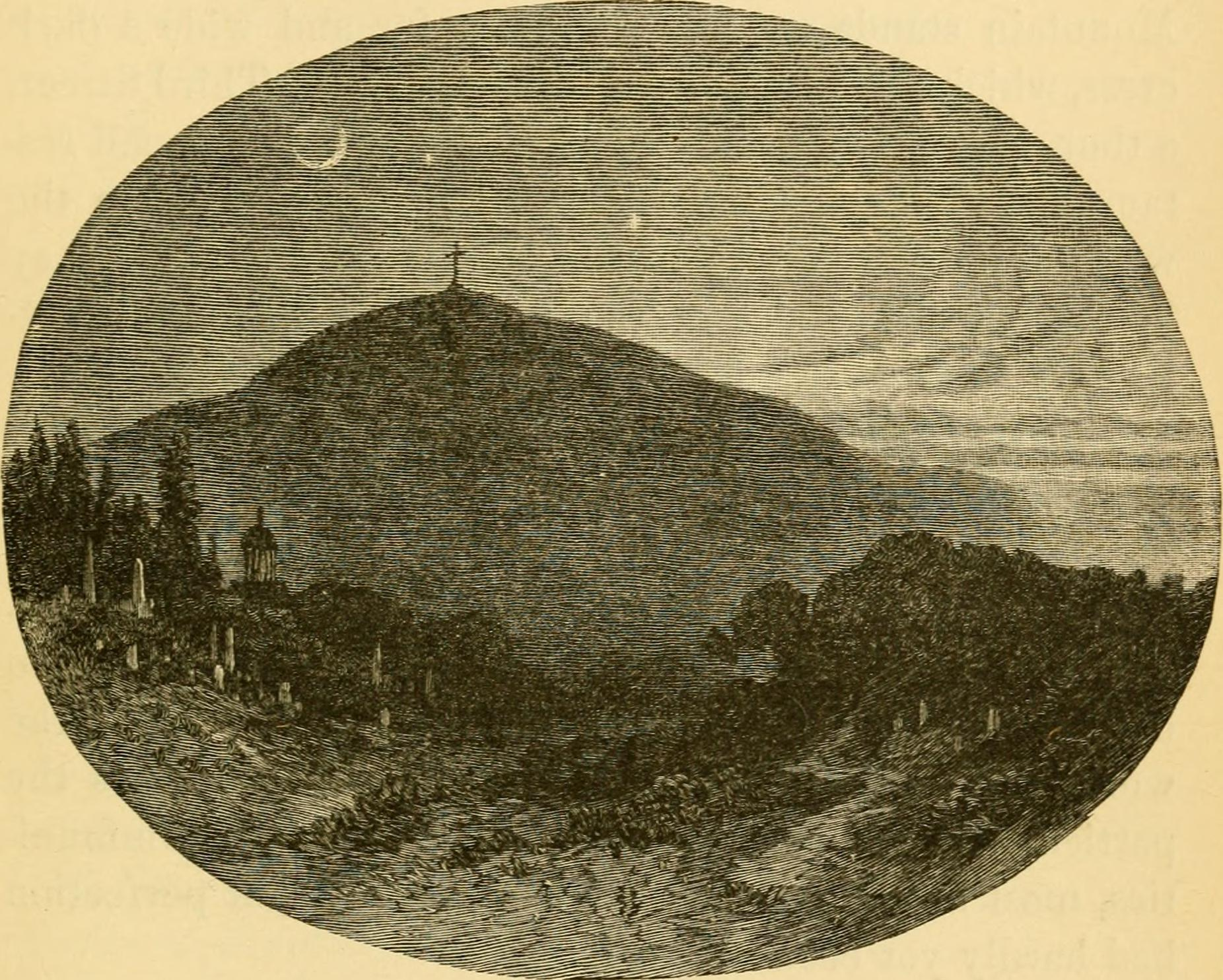
Lone Mountain

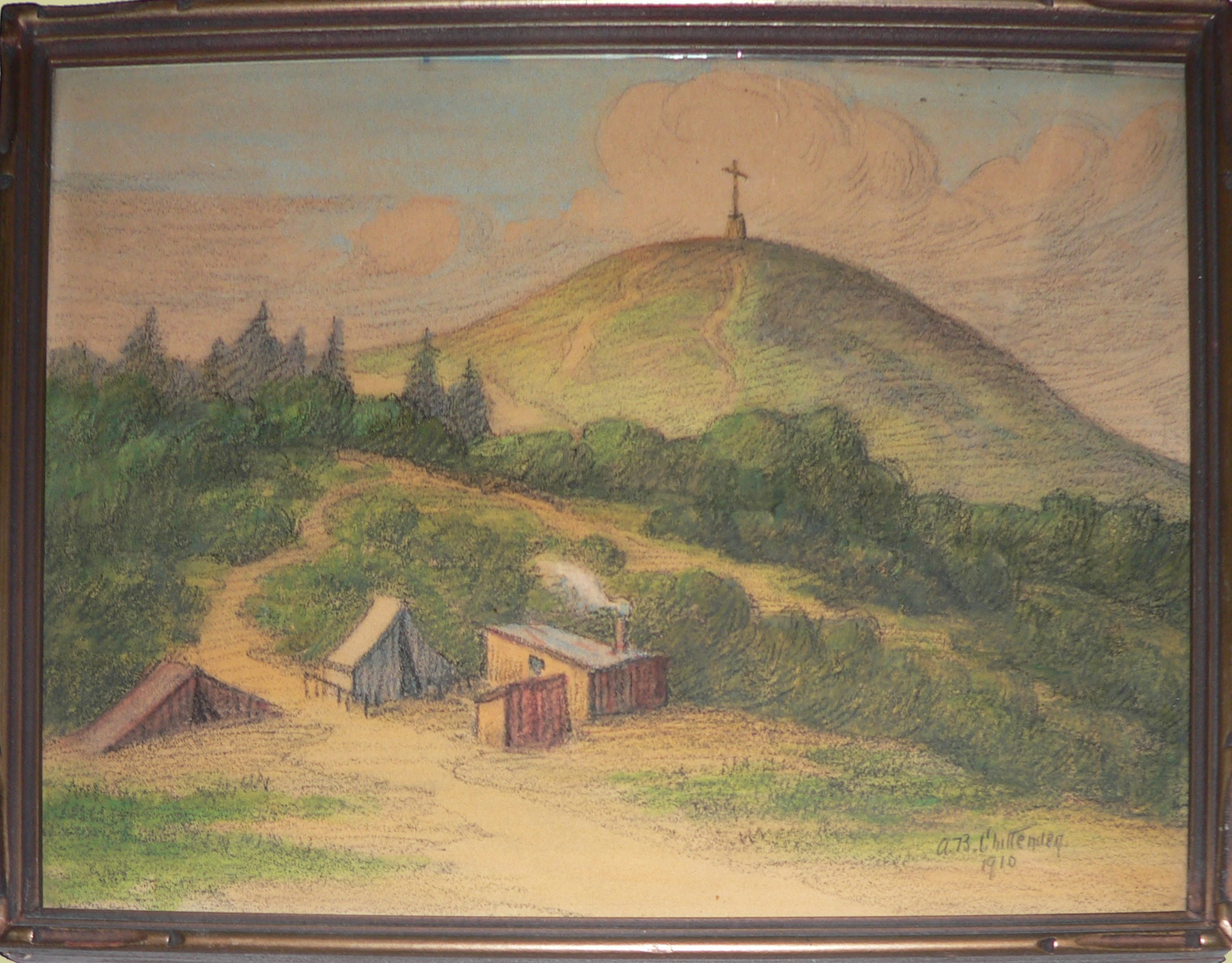
Watercolor (1910) by Alice Brown Chittenden. Tents are remnants of camps after the 1906 earthquake.

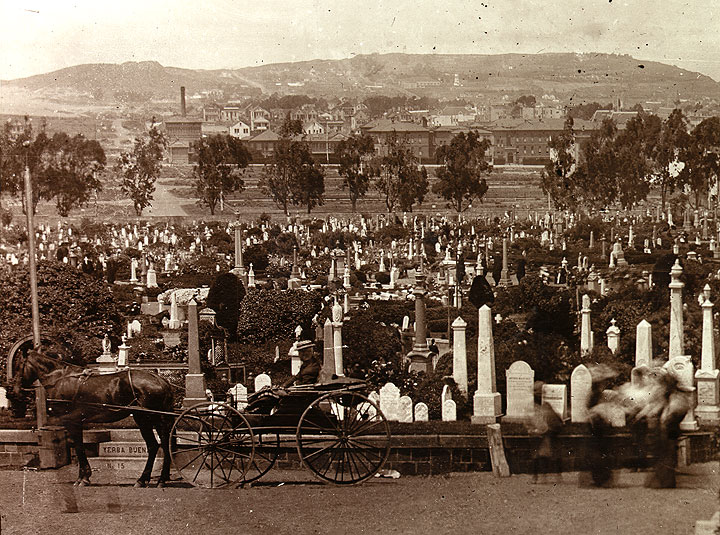
Odd Fellows Cemetery, 1899

== Neighborhood ==
The Lone Mountain neighborhood of San Francisco is a community which includes residential and commercial areas, and is a university community. It is also the site of the Angelo J. Rossi Playground and Rossi Pool located at Arguello Boulevard and Anza Street.

== See also ==
- List of San Francisco, California Hills
- San Francisco Columbarium & Funeral Home
