= Mount Olympus (San Francisco) =

Hill in San Francisco, California, US

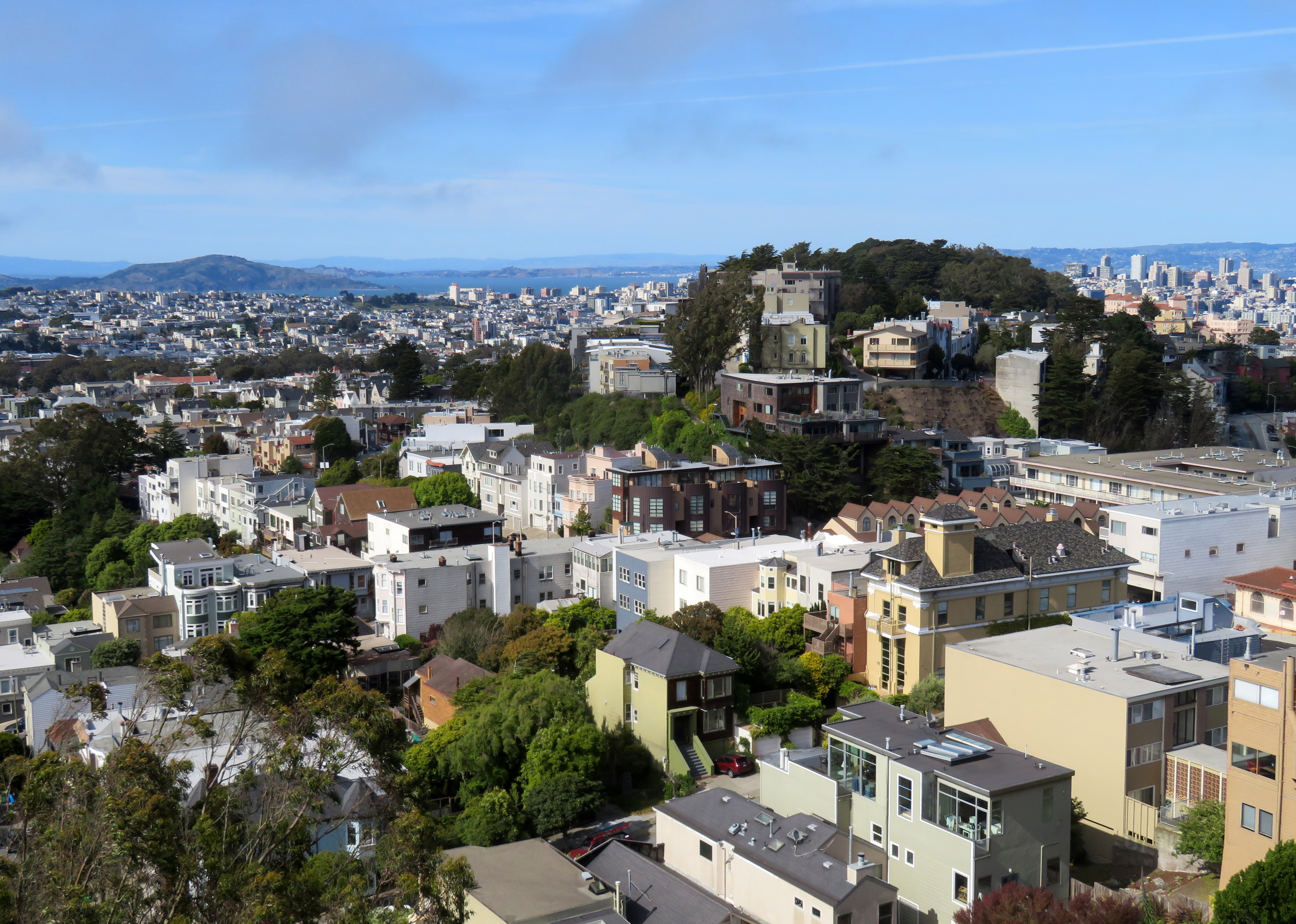
- Mount Olympus viewed from Tank Hill in 2020
- Interactive map of Mount Olympus
- Type: Open space park
- Location: San Francisco, California
- Coordinates: 37°45′47″N 122°26′44″W
- Area: 1,000 yd^{2} (840 m^{2})
- Elevation: 553 feet (169 m)
- Operator: San Francisco Recreation & Parks

Mount Olympus is a hill located on Upper Terrace in the Buena Vista neighborhood of San Francisco. It was once considered to mark the geographical center of the city, and was topped off by a statue given by Adolph Sutro, the Triumph of Light, now lost. Only the statue's pedestal remains, and the view from the top is obstructed by trees and condominiums.
