= Lincoln Heights (San Francisco) =

Coordinates: 37°46′56″N 122°29′59″W

Lincoln Heights is the 24th highest peak in the city of San Francisco, California, at 380 feet. Situated in the northwestestern portion of the city, the hill has the Legion of Honor museum near its peak. Notable features include the Lincoln Park golf course, the Lands End trail system, and some residential neighborhoods in the Richmond District.
