= Strawberry Hill (San Francisco) =

Hill in San Francisco

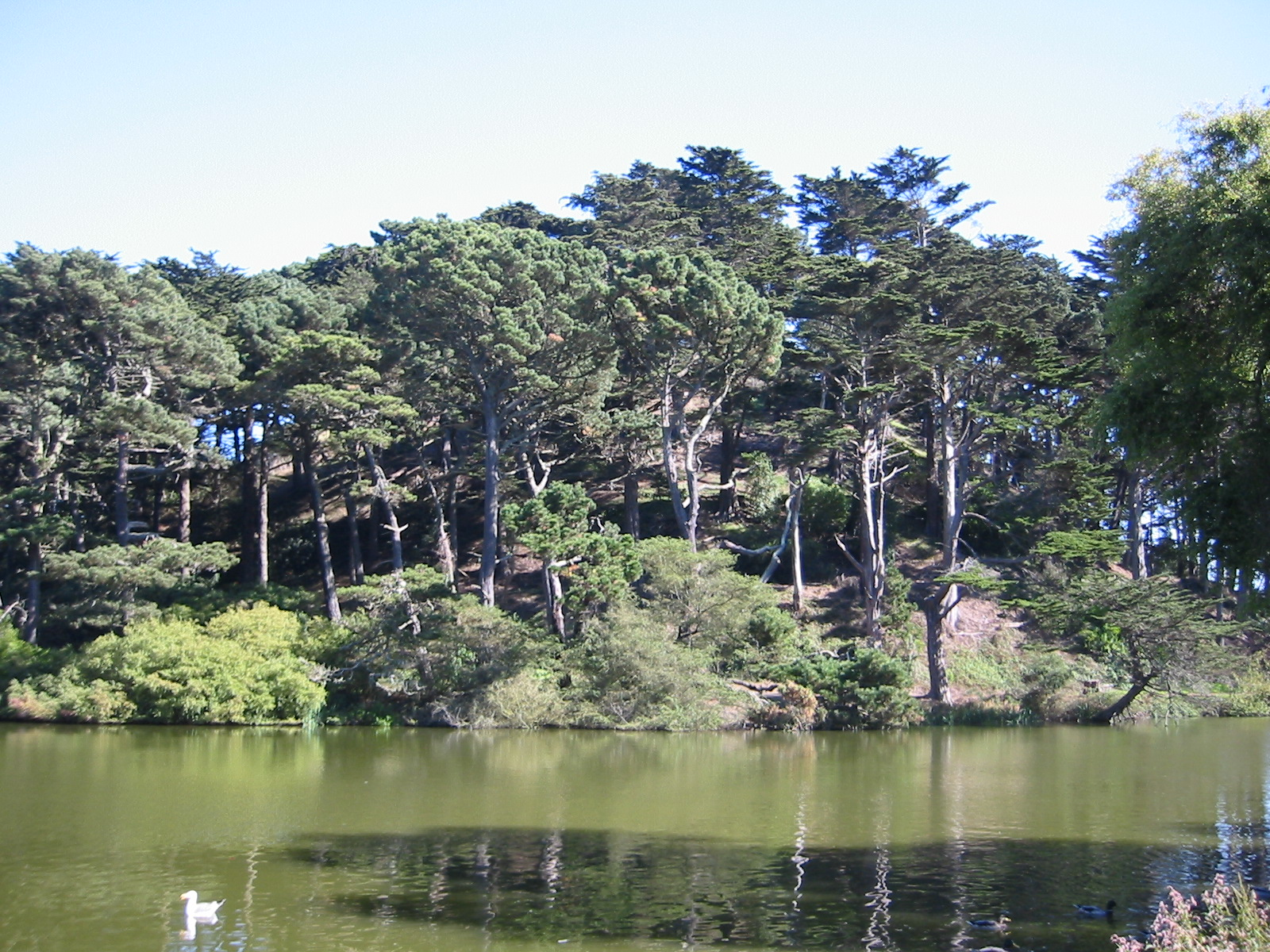
- Strawberry Hill in Golden Gate Park

Highest point
- Elevation: 404 ft (123 m) NAVD 88
- Coordinates: 37°46′07″N 122°28′32″W

Geography
- Location within San Francisco County
- Location: San Francisco, California, U.S.
- Topo map: USGS San Francisco North

Strawberry Hill is a hill in San Francisco, California, near the center of Golden Gate Park. The hill occupies an entire island in the park's man-made Blue Heron Lake, and is connected by two bridges to the mainland of the park.

The island is covered with a variety of trees and shrubbery and contains several trails and dirt steps that encircle and lead to the top of the hill.

== Huntington Falls ==
Strawberry hill contains Huntington Falls, the 110 foot tall, first artificial waterfall installed in Golden Gate Park that leads into the lake. The waterfall was named after railroad baron Collis Potter Huntington, who donated $25,000 to its construction.

== Golden Gate Pavilion ==
The Golden Gate Pavilion is a Chinese peace pagoda near the shore of Blue Heron Lake. It was given to San Francisco by Taipei, its sister city, in 1976.

== Sweeney Observatory ==
The top of the hill is a quiet and peaceful open space with panoramic views of San Francisco although the view is slightly obscured by trees. In the center of the open area are the ruined foundations of the Sweeny Observatory, built in 1891 as a public viewpoint and destroyed by the 1906 earthquake.

Paths are closed to vehicle traffic. The hill is a popular destination for joggers and dog-walkers, especially on the weekends. Local high school track and cross country teams are frequently seen practicing running up and around the hill for resistance training.

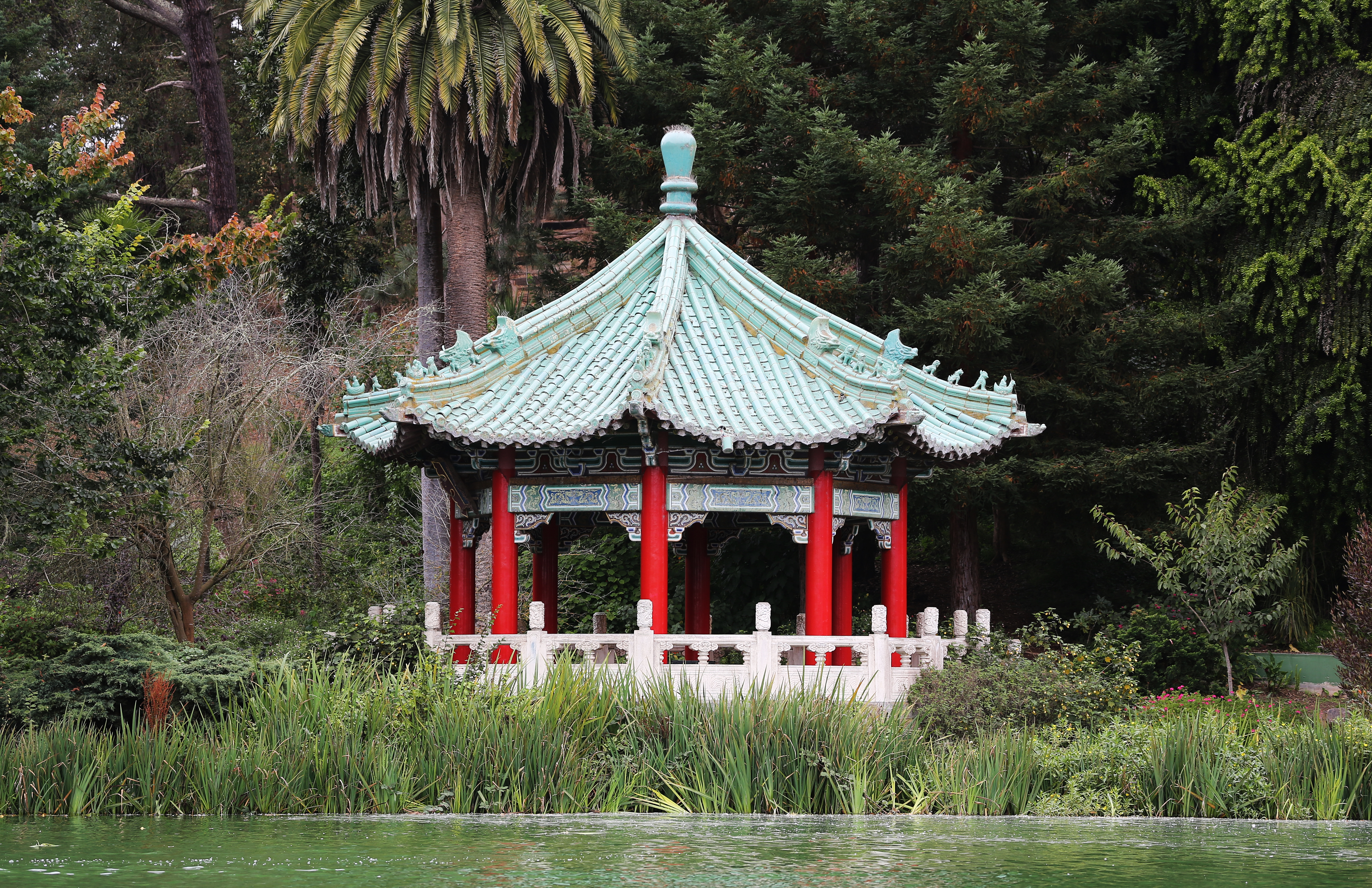
Golden Gate Pavilion

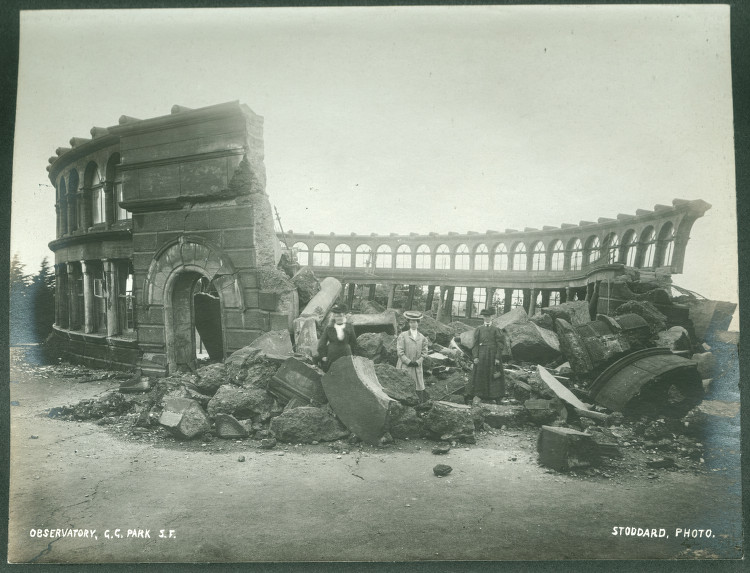
Sweeny Observatory Ruins after the 1906 earthquake

== In popular culture ==
In 2024, the hill was discussed during an episode of The Metallica Report, as Ron Quintana shared memories of first meeting drummer Lars Ulrich there.

Slowcore band Red House Painters composed a song named after the hill for their 1993 album Red House Painters (Rollercoaster).
