= Jerry Mixon =

American football linebacker

No. 6 – Oregon Ducks
- Position: Linebacker
- Class: Junior

Personal information
- Listed height: 6 ft 3 in (1.91 m)
- Listed weight: 248 lb (112 kg)

Career information
- High school: Sacred Heart Cathedral (San Francisco, California)
- College: Oregon (2023–present)
- Stats at ESPN

Jerry Mixon is an American football linebacker for the Oregon Ducks.

== Early life ==
Mixon attended high school at Sacred Heart Cathedral Preparatory. Coming out of high school, he committed to play college football for the Oregon Ducks.

== College career ==
During his first two collegiate seasons in 2023 and 2024, he appeared in 19 total games, recording eight tackles and a sack. In week 2 of the 2025 season, Mixon notched a tackle and an interception which he returned 26 yards for a touchdown in a win over Oklahoma State. In week 3, he totaled five tackles and an interception in a victory versus Northwestern, where he was named the Big Ten Defensive Player of the Week for his performance. In week 11, Mixon notched a team-high 13 tackles in a win against Iowa.

== Personal life ==
His brother John Mixon played as a running back for the Troy Trojans, while he is also the cousin of Pro Bowl running back Joe Mixon.
