= Laguna Honda Reservoir =

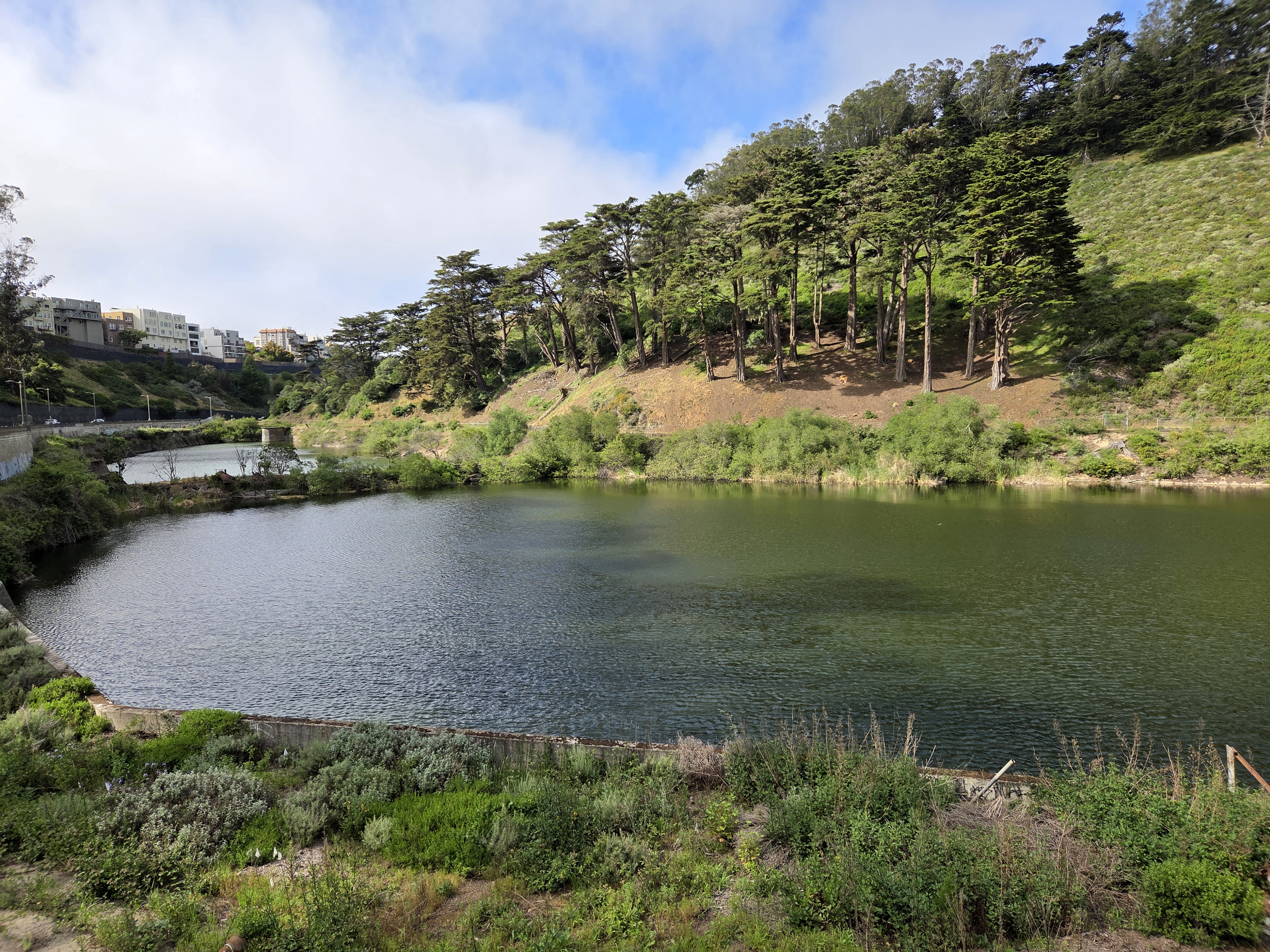
- Laguna Honda Reservoir in 2026

- Location within California
- Location: San Francisco, California
- Coordinates: 37°45′09″N 122°27′44″W
- Type: reservoir
- Basin countries: United States
- Max. length: 1,200 ft (370 m)
- Max. width: 300 ft (91 m)
- Surface elevation: 390 feet (120 m)
- Settlements: San Francisco

Laguna Honda is a reservoir on the southwest shoulder of Mount Sutro in San Francisco, California.

== History ==
In 1865, the Spring Valley Water Works built a 13-mile (21 km) long redwood pipeline to transport drinking water from Pilarcitos Lake Reservoir in Pilarcitos Canyon to this reservoir. The 1906 San Francisco earthquake destroyed the pipeline. The lake and the surrounding land are now managed by the San Francisco Public Utilities Commission.

== See also ==
- List of lakes in California
- List of lakes in the San Francisco Bay Area
