= Tank Hill =

Park in San Francisco, California

Tank Hill Park
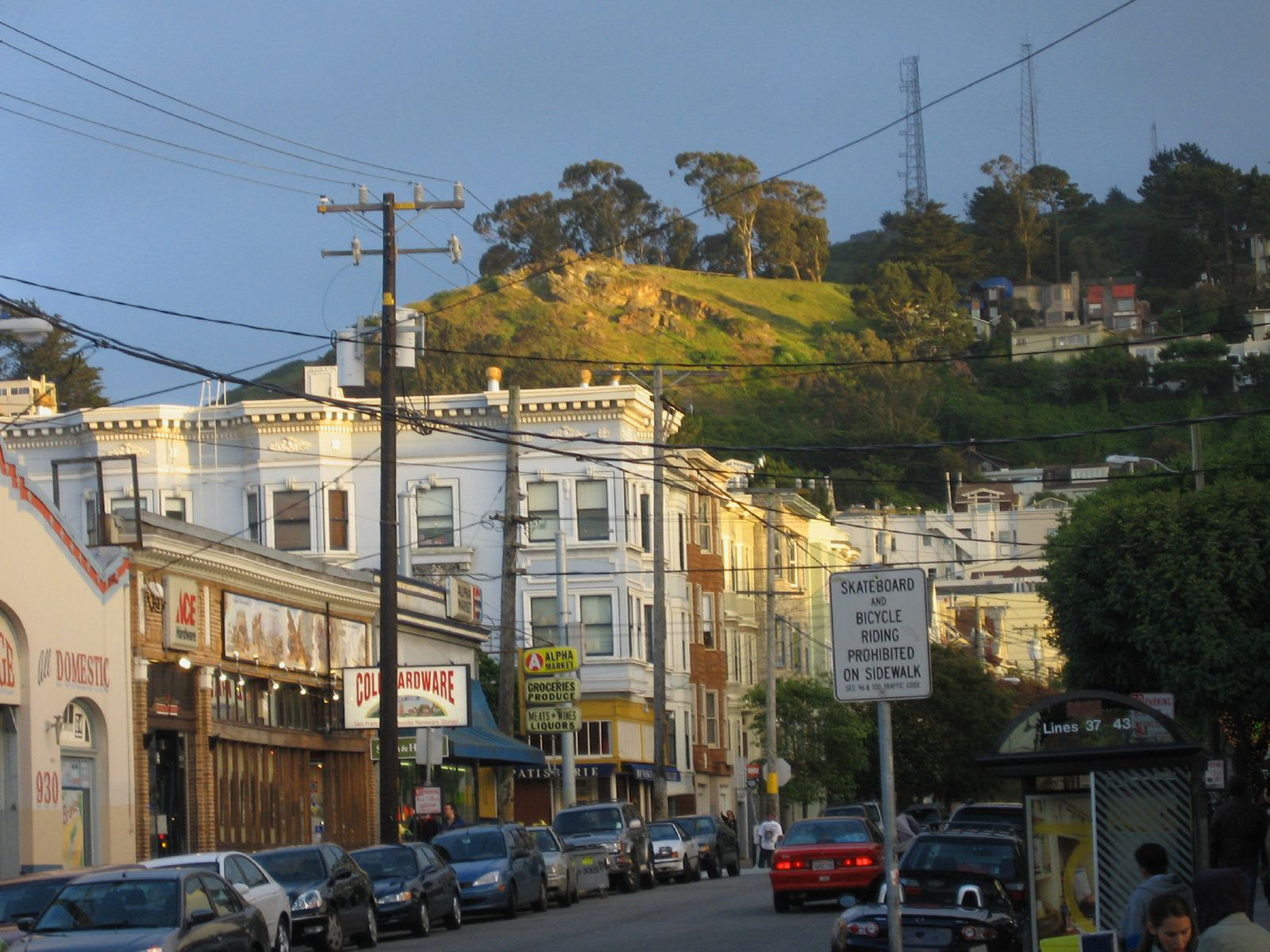
- Tank Hill from below
- Interactive map of Tank Hill Park
- Type: Municipal Park & Natural Area
- Location: San Francisco, California
- Coordinates: 37°45′36″N 122°26′52″W
- Area: 2.87 acres (1.16 ha)
- Elevation: 650 feet (198 m)
- Created: 1977
- Operator: San Francisco Recreation & Parks Department
- Website: sfrecpark.org/facilities/facility/details/tankhill-380

Tank Hill Park is a municipal park in the Ashbury Heights neighborhood of San Francisco, California. The hill is named for a water tank that formerly stood there, and was acquired for park use in 1977.

== History ==
The hill gained its name from the 500,000-gallon Clarendon Heights Water Tank built there by the Spring Valley Water Company in 1894. In the aftermath of the 1941 attack on Pearl Harbor and the United States' entry into World War II, blue gum eucalyptus trees were planted around the tank to conceal it. The City of San Francisco acquired the water company in the 1930s and replaced the tank with the Twin Peaks Reservoir. The tank was removed in 1957, leaving a concrete platform.

In 1961, the city rezoned Tank Hill for single-family housing and put it up for sale. It was purchased by a developer for $230,000, but a group led by Supervisor Ron Pelosi argued that it should instead be a park. An amendment to the city charter instructing the city to repurchase it for that purpose was passed in 1975. The Board of Supervisors were reluctant to pay the asking price of $650,000, but were persuaded by students from nearby Grattan Elementary School, who brought to City Hall paintings of the hill that they had made in class. The repurchase through the Open Space Program was authorized on September 28, 1977.

== Description ==
Tank Hill covers 2.87 acres with a 650-foot peak. Overlooking Cole Valley and Eureka Valley, it is circumscribed to the south and east by Twin Peaks Boulevard, near its intersection with Clayton Street. Entrance to the park is via flights of wooden steps from Twin Peaks Boulevard and from Belgrave Avenue. The park is naturally grassy, and hosts more than 50 native species of plants, including many wildflowers; the parks department has removed some eucalyptus trees in favor of the native species.

Tank Hill offers a 270º panorama of San Francisco. A bench faces east. The park is a popular viewing site for 4th of July fireworks, affording views of displays in Oakland and the East Bay as well as the traditional City of San Francisco fireworks show at Crissy Field.

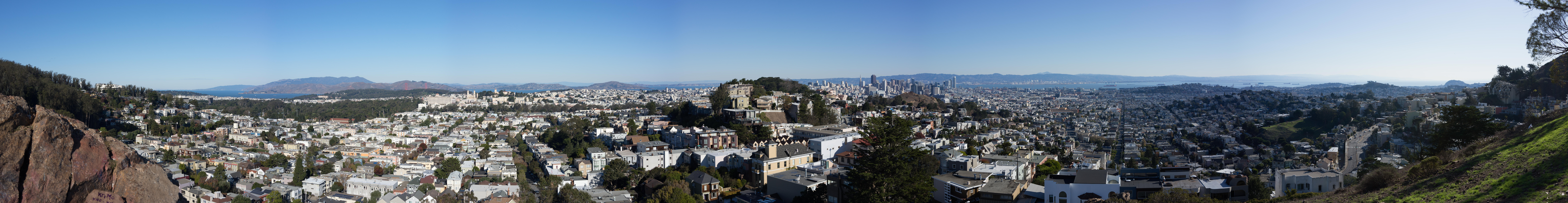
227-degree panorama from the top of Tank Hill

== See also ==
- List of parks in San Francisco
- List of San Francisco, California Hills
