= Sacred Heart Cathedral Preparatory =

Location
- 1055 Ellis Street; Cathedral Hill; San Francisco (Cathedral Hill), California 94109; United States; 37°46′59″N 122°25′24″W

Information
- Type: Private, Coeducational
- Motto: Signum Fidei. Caritas Christi Urget Nos. (Sign of Faith. Christ's Love Urges Us.)
- Religious affiliations: Catholic; Daughters of Charity; Christian Brothers
- Established: 1852 (St. Vincent/Cathedral); 1874 (Sacred Heart); 1987 (Sacred Heart and Cathedral merged)
- School district: Archdiocese of San Francisco
- President: Melinda Lawlor Skrade
- Grades: 9-12
- Enrollment: 1,354 (2020)
- Campus: Urban
- Colors: Forest green, Arctic white and royal blue
- Slogan: Enter to Learn, Leave to Serve
- Fight song: Alma Mater
- Athletics conference: West Catholic Athletic League
- Mascot: Seamus
- Team name: Fightin' Irish
- Rival: St. Ignatius College Preparatory
- Accreditation: Western Association of Schools and Colleges
- Publication: Oracle (creative writing journal)
- Newspaper: Emerald
- Yearbook: Shamrock
- Endowment: $16 Million
- Tuition: Domestic: $26,500 +fees/pledge International: $33,000 +fees/pledge
- National Merit Scholars: 4 (class of 2023)
- Website: www.shcp.edu

Sacred Heart Cathedral Preparatory, commonly known as SHC, is a Catholic school located in the Cathedral Hill neighborhood of San Francisco, California. Founded in 1852, Sacred Heart Cathedral is the oldest Catholic secondary school and was the first co-ed Catholic high school in San Francisco. SHC is owned by the Archdiocese of San Francisco.

== History ==
Sacred Heart Cathedral Preparatory was formed by a merger between two single-sex schools — St. Vincent's and Sacred Heart High School.

St. Vincent's was founded in 1852 as an orphanage and a girls' day school by five sisters of the Daughters of Charity. In 1868, the Christian Brothers would open St. Peter’s Parochial School, whose grammar and high school divisions would be run by the Christian Brothers until 1953. Sacred Heart College was established in 1874 and had a curriculum spanning grammar school, high school along with a 3-year college program, after which students could transfer to St. Mary's College to complete their 4th year of college education. The college was located at Eddy & Larkin Streets from 1874 until 1906, relocated to Fell Street until 1914 then at Ellis & Franklin until present. College courses were eliminated in 1922 and the grammar school division was eliminated in 1928. SHC, along with St. Vincent's, were destroyed during the 1906 San Francisco Earthquake. St. Vincent’s school would eventually be rebuilt, and moved three more times, finally settling on the corner of Gough and Geary streets in 1938. In 1966, the St. Vincent’s would be razed to make way for St. Mary's Cathedral, rebuilt adjacent to it, then renamed Cathedral High School.

The schools would merge together in 1987 into Sacred Heart Cathedral Preparatory, after having collaborated together since 1967.

== Facilities ==
The school is located in San Francisco's Cathedral Hill District, with the two academic buildings located on the corner of Gough and Ellis Streets. A field used by the school's athletic teams for practice is also located on the corner of Gough and Eddy Streets.

=== De Paul Campus for the Arts ===
On the northwest corner of the intersection is the former Cathedral High School building, now named the De Paul Campus for the Arts in honor of St. Vincent de Paul. It houses the Sister Caroline Collins, DC, Theater, opened in fall of 2010; freshman lockers; the history, visual and performing arts, and Language Other than English (LOTE) departments. Starting in 2020, the DePaul Campus underwent renovations to modernize the front lobby, which are now completed.

The building adjoins San Francisco's Cathedral of Saint Mary of the Assumption; the school's former building was razed by the Archdiocese of San Francisco to make room for the construction of the new Cathedral. The cathedral's rectory is adjacent to the De Paul Campus, but there is no access to it from the school; the entrance is located on the northeast corner entrance of the campus. Pope John Paul II stayed in the rectory at the De Paul Campus during his trip to San Francisco in 1987, which is marked by a plaque at the entrance of the rectory.

=== La Salle campus ===
The La Salle campus is named in honor of St. John Baptist de La Salle. This campus has a six-story building which houses school administration offices, the library, the Community Life Center, and the English, Mathematics, Science, and Religion departments. The library occupies the entire sixth story, except for a small chapel and veranda.

=== Student Life Center ===
The Sister Teresa Piro, DC, Student Life Center, completed in 2004 at an estimated cost of $16 million, houses a 1,500-seat athletic gym (called the Pavilion) and 1,000-seat Dining Hall. The building is adjoined to an older facility housing a gymnasium, weight room, fitness center, and robotics lab.

== Tuition and enrollment ==
Tuition at SHC costs $26,500 per student in the 2024-25 term. SHC provides an array of courses, including college preparatory, honors, and Advanced Placement classes. All students are required to take English and Religious Studies for four years, as well as three years of Math and Social Studies. SHC uses a tracking system for math, with students typically being placed on one of three tracks in their freshman years. They must also take one year of a Visual or Performing Art (VPA) to graduate. Most students additionally opt to take three or four years of Science and a foreign language. Sacred Heart Cathedral enrolls approximately 1,300 students from San Francisco and its suburbs.

== Athletics ==
The athletic teams, known as the Fightin' Irish, compete in the West Catholic Athletic League. There are 22 teams and 53 sport levels for boys and girls at SHC split into Fall, Winter, and Spring seasons.

In the 2021-2022 school year, Sacred Heart Cathedral claimed its first CIF football title in school history after winning the Division 4-A state championship game.

=== Rivalry with St. Ignatius College Preparatory ===
Sacred Heart Cathedral's traditional rival is St. Ignatius College Preparatory, also located in San Francisco. The rivalry between the two schools began with a two men who attended the schools. Bill Bruce attended SI and Jerry Mahoney attended SHC. The trophy was inaugurated in 1947 and is named in honor of Bill Bruce and Jerry Mahoney, each an alumnus exclusively representing one of the schools, both of whom were killed in World War II.

The two schools play against each other in football, boys basketball, baseball, and added in 2021, girls volleyball and basketball. In basketball, baseball, and volleyball where the teams play more than one game per season, only the first game counts towards winning the trophy. The trophy goes to the school that wins in three out of the five games.

== Notable alumni ==
- James J. Corbett, 1880 – Professional boxer
- Pete McDonough, 1889 – San Francisco businessman, saloon owner, and storyteller
- William J. Quinn, 1901 – Chief of Police of San Francisco, California
- Maurice J. Sullivan, 1902 – American politician, U.S. Representative and Lt. Governor of Nevada
- Arthur Ohnimus, 1911 – American politician, Chief Clerk of the California Assembly
- Harry Heilmann, 1912 – Professional baseball player inducted into the Baseball Hall of Fame
- Joe Cronin, 1924 – Professional baseball player, inducted into Hall of Fame and American League president
- Dolph Camilli, 1924 – Professional baseball player for the Brooklyn Dodgers
- Joseph Alioto, 1933 – Mayor of San Francisco from 1968 to 1976
- Jim Delaney, 1939 – athlete, silver medal winner in shot put 1948 Olympic Games
- Bob Marshall, 1952 – Mayor of San Bruno, California (1980-1992)
- Jim Gentile, 1952 – Major League baseball player
- Frank Jordan, 1953 – Mayor of San Francisco from 1992 to 1996
- John Patrick Diggins, 1953 – American historian and professor
- Gary Lucchesi, 1973 – American film producer
- Kevin Gogan, 1983 – Professional football player for the Dallas Cowboys, Los Angeles / Oakland Raiders, San Francisco 49ers, Miami Dolphins, and San Diego Chargers
- Joe Peterson, 1983 – Professional football player for the New England Patriots
- Eric White, 1983 – Professional basketball player
- Justin Love, 1996 – Professional basketball player
- Shannon Rowbury, 2002 – United States Olympic Runner and outdoor distance medley relay record holder
- Jason Hill, 2003 – Professional Football Player
- Leah McKendrick, 2004 - Actress, Writer, Producer of Netflix's original series "Voicemails for Isabelle"
- Doug Parrish, 2010 – Professional football player
- Joshua Fox, 2011 – Professional basketball player
- Celeste Boureille, 2012 – Professional soccer player
- Jacky Yip (Stewie2K), 2015 – Professional E-Sports player for Counter-Strike: Global Offensive
- Keith Ismael, 2016 – Professional football player in the National Football League (NFL)
- Jerry Mixon, 2023 – College football linebacker for the Oregon Ducks
- Vinnie Massaro, 1998? – Professional wrestler

== See also ==
- San Francisco high schools
- Lasallian Educational Institutions
