= Twin Peaks (San Francisco) =

Two prominent hills in San Francisco, California

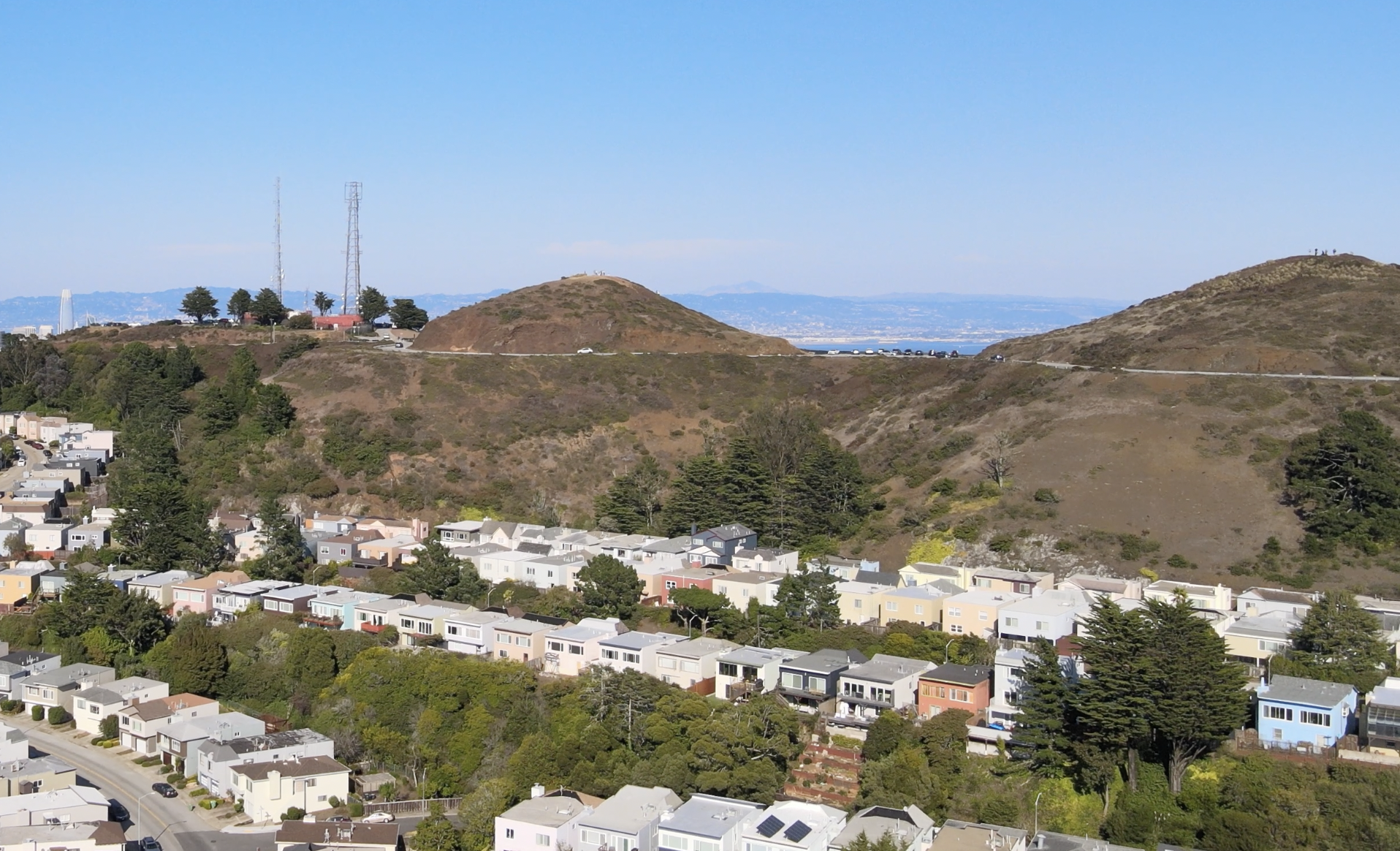
- The Twin Peaks
- Interactive map of Twin Peaks
- Type: Municipal (San Francisco)
- Location: San Francisco
- Area: 34 acres (14 ha)
- Operator: San Francisco Recreation & Parks
- Status: Open all year
- Location within San Francisco County

Highest point
- Elevation: 925 ft (282 m) NAVD 88
- Listing: San Francisco Hill
- Coordinates: 37°45′06″N 122°26′52″W

Geography
- Location: San Francisco, California, U.S.
- Topo map: USGS San Francisco North

Climbing
- Easiest route: Paved road, hike

The Twin Peaks are two prominent hills with an elevation of about 925 feet (282 m) located near the geographic center of San Francisco, California. The Twin Peaks are the second and third highest natural points in San Francisco; only 928 foot (283 m) Mount Davidson is higher within city limits.

== Location and climate ==
Twin Peaks, along with Mount Davidson and Mount Sutro, create a rugged landscape in the center of San Francisco which influences microclimates in the city. The mountain acts as a natural barrier against summer fog for the city's eastern neighborhoods.

The North and South Twin Peaks, also known as "Eureka" and "Noe", are about 660 ft (200 m) apart. The peaks form a divide for the summer coastal fog pushed in from the Pacific Ocean. Their west-facing slopes often get fog and strong winds, while the east-facing slopes receive more sun and warmth. Elevation at each summit is just over 900 feet (270 m). Thin, sandy soil is commonplace on Twin Peaks, making them susceptible to erosion.

On rare occasions, Twin Peaks has had a dusting of snow. On February 5, 1976, it received several inches of snow.

== History ==
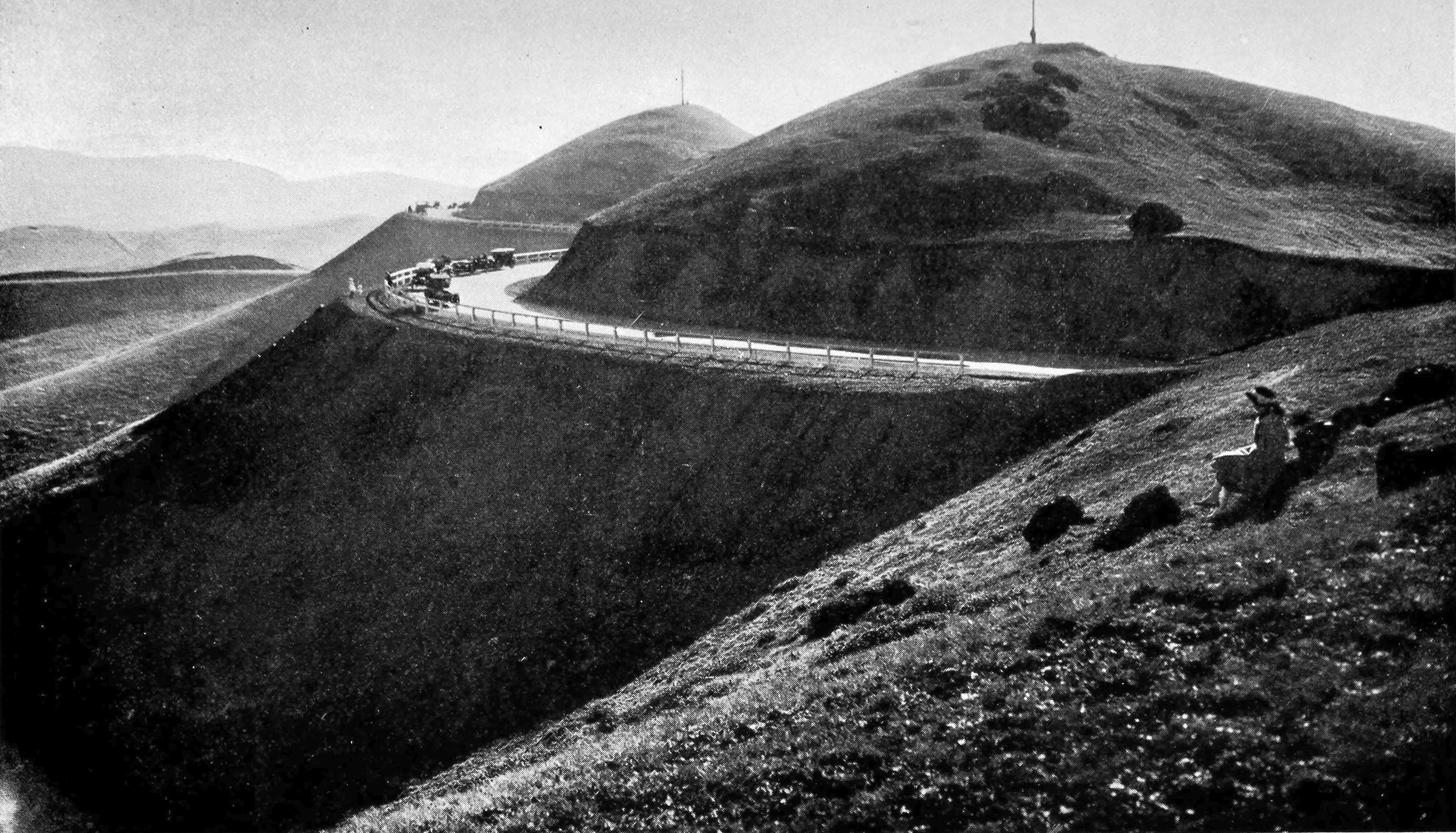
Twin Peaks Boulevard, 1920

=== Early history ===
Before the arrival of the Europeans, the native Ohlone people may have used Twin Peaks as a lookout or hunting ground.

=== 18th and 19th centuries ===
When the Spanish conquistadors and settlers arrived at the beginning of the 18th century, they called the area "Los Pechos de la Chola" or "Breasts of the Indian Maiden" and devoted the area to ranching. When San Francisco passed under American control during the 19th century, it was renamed "Twin Peaks".

=== 21st century ===
In 2016 the SFMTA introduced a traffic calming pilot to reduce the amount of space allocated to cars and make the summit area more inviting to a wider range of travel modes. The "figure 8" roadway around the two peaks was reduced to a two-way road on the western side of the peaks, with the east side designated for pedestrians and bikes only. In 2025 construction will begin to rebuild the east side as a wide promenade, following improvements to the Noe Peak trail and the trail down to Crestline Drive.

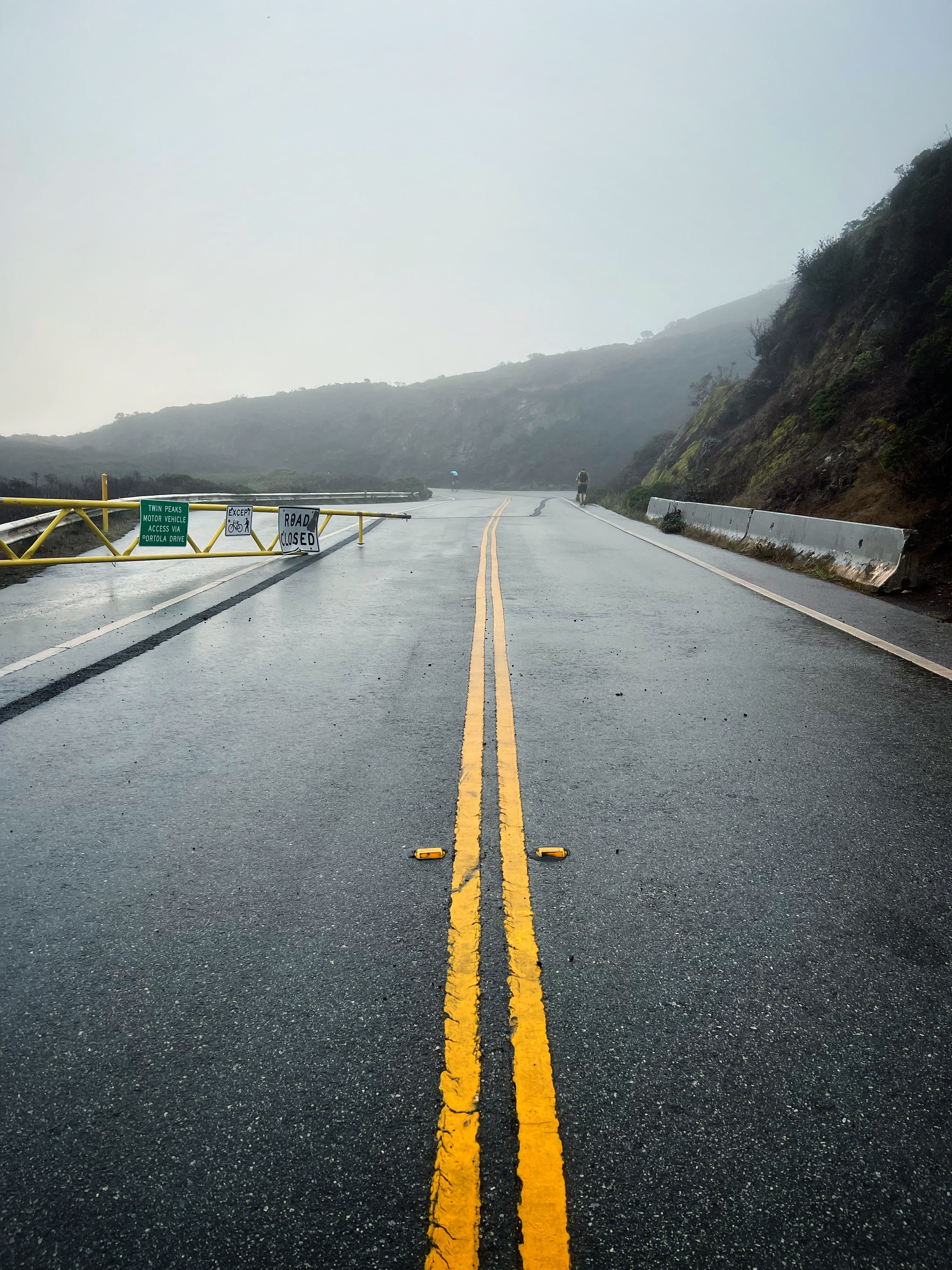
East side of Twin Peaks Boulevard, for pedestrians and bikes only

== Attractions ==
Christmas Tree Point lies some 70 ft (20 m) below the North Peak and offers vistas of San Francisco and San Francisco Bay. The view to the north extends no farther than Cobb Mountain (38.807°N 122.741°W) 120 km (75 mi) away, but looking southeast down the Santa Clara Valley on a clear day, Santa Ana Mountain 36.8782°N 121.2637°W is just visible 143 km (89 mi) away.

To the north is one of the city's many reservoirs. It is owned by the San Francisco Fire Department, and supplies water to the Fire Department's independent HPFS water system for fighting fires, established after the 1906 earthquake and fire.

The top of Twin Peaks is undeveloped. It is part of the 31 acres (13 ha) Twin Peaks Natural Area, managed and owned by the San Francisco Recreation and Parks Department. These preserved areas are home to many natural resources and wildlife. As part of the Mission blue butterfly habitat conservation, Twin Peaks is one of the few remaining habitats for this endangered species. Many bird species, insects and vegetation thrive in these areas.

Every year since 1995, volunteers have installed the Twin Peaks Pink Triangle during Pride Month, a 1-acre triangle made of pink sailcloths that faces towards the Castro District and downtown.

The Muni Metro Twin Peaks Tunnel runs beneath Twin Peaks, linking downtown San Francisco with West Portal and the southwestern part of the city. There is no public transportation all the way to the top of the Peaks, but the 37 Corbett Muni line stops on Crestline Drive near a path up the hill.

The name "Twin Peaks" is also applied to the surrounding neighborhood.

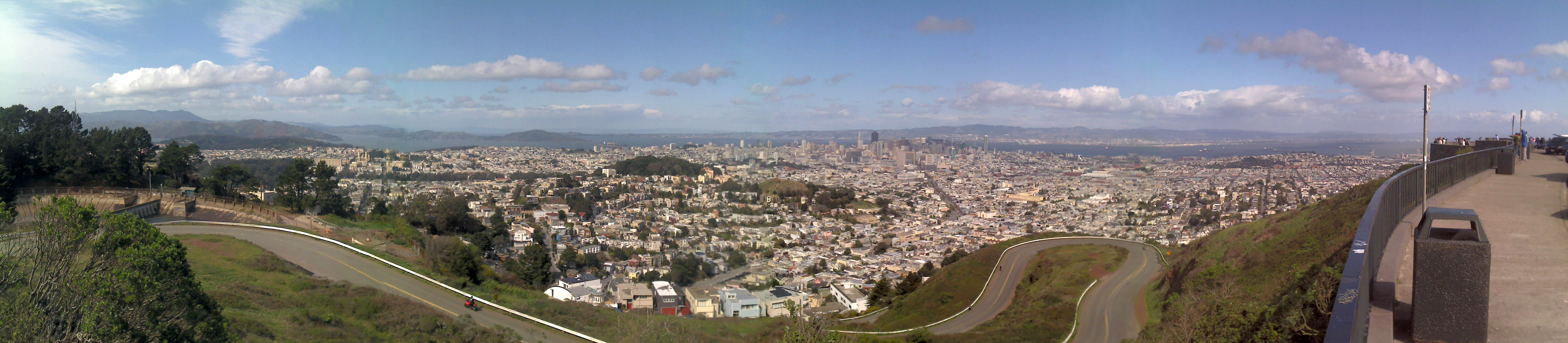
View to the northeast towards downtown San Francisco

== Education ==
The San Francisco Unified School District operates the Ruth Asawa San Francisco School of the Arts in the Twin Peaks neighborhood. The closest SFUSD school to the top of Twin Peaks is Rooftop.

== See also ==
- 49-Mile Scenic Drive
- List of hills in San Francisco
- Twin Peaks Tunnel
