= Cathedral Hill, San Francisco =

Cathedral Hill
- Neighborhood
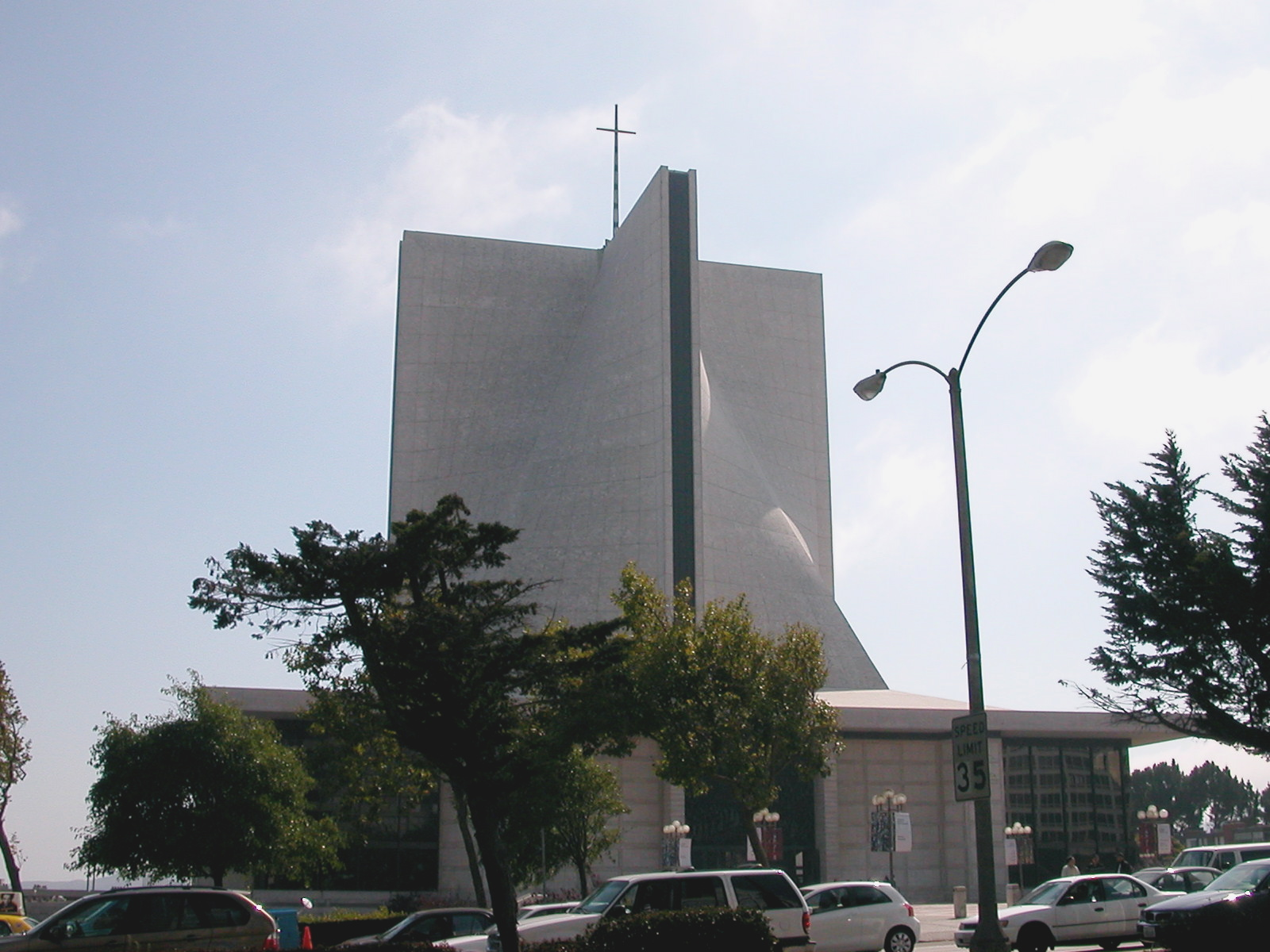
- Looking south from Geary St. to St. Mary's Cathedral, around which Cathedral Hill is centered.

- Location within Central San Francisco
- Coordinates: 37.78423°N 122.42537°W
- Country: United States
- State: California
- City-county: San Francisco

Government
  - Board of Supervisors: Catherine Stefani
  - Assemblymember: Matt Haney (D)
  - State senator: Scott Wiener (D)
  - U. S. rep.: Nancy Pelosi (D)

Area
  - Total: 0.095 sq mi (0.25 km^{2})

Population
  - Total: 2,868
  - Density: 30,000/sq mi (12,000/km^{2})
- Time zone: UTC−8 (Pacific)
  - Summer (DST): UTC−7 (PDT)
- ZIP code: 94109
- Area codes: 415/628

Cathedral Hill is a neighborhood and a hill, in the Western Addition district of San Francisco, California.

== Location ==
The neighborhood's northern border is Post Street, the eastern border is Van Ness Avenue, the southern border is Eddy Street and the western border is Laguna Street.

== Attractions and characteristics ==
The neighborhood is centered on St. Mary's Cathedral on the corner of Geary Street and Gough Street.

It is home to large condominium and apartment towers, plus numerous churches built atop the hill, including St. Mary's Cathedral, St. Mark's Lutheran Church, The First Unitarian Church of San Francisco, and the Hamilton Baptist Church.

The neighborhood's former Cathedral Hill Hotel at Van Ness and Geary Streets was torn down and replaced by a new earthquake-safe California Pacific Medical Center hospital between 2013 and 2021.

The Sacred Heart Cathedral Prep school is in the neighborhood.

== See also ==
- List of San Francisco, California Hills
- Neighborhoods of San Francisco
