= Mount Sutro =

Hill in San Francisco

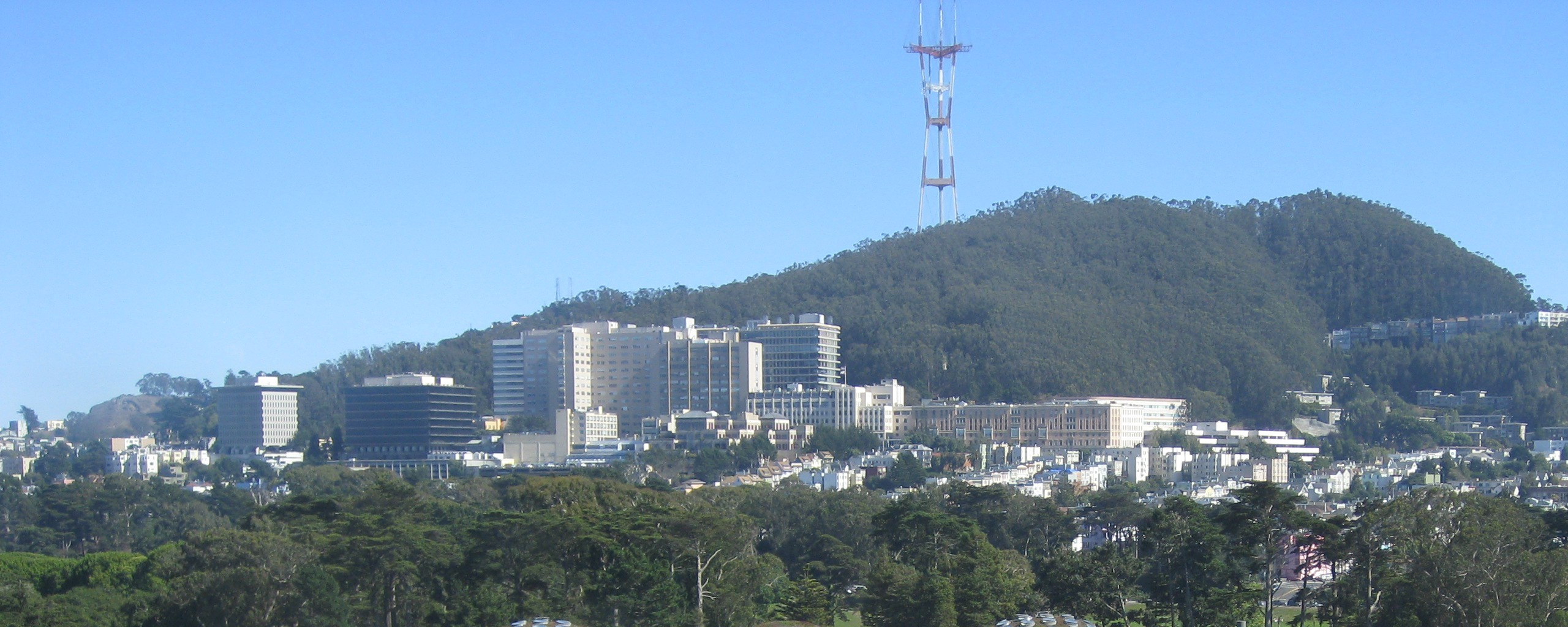
- Mount Sutro, with UCSF and the Sutro Tower, seen from Golden Gate Park.

Highest point
- Elevation: 911 ft (278 m) NAVD 88
- Prominence: 208 ft (63 m)
- Listing: San Francisco Hill
- Coordinates: 37°45′30″N 122°27′26″W

Geography
- Location: San Francisco, California, U.S.

Climbing
- Easiest route: Hike, Paved Road

Mount Sutro is a hill in central San Francisco, California. It was originally named Mount Parnassus.

== Geography ==
The low mountain is 909 feet (277 m) in elevation. Mount Sutro is one of the many named hills within San Francisco, and among its original "Seven Hills".

Most of Mount Sutro is owned by the University of California, San Francisco (UCSF). A 61-acre (25 ha) parcel, including the summit, is protected as the Mount Sutro Open Space Reserve by UCSF, and open to the public.

Sutro Tower, a large television and radio broadcasting tower for the San Francisco Bay Area and very visible City landmark, is not on Mount Sutro. It stands on a lower hill to the south between it and Twin Peaks.

== Sutro Forest ==
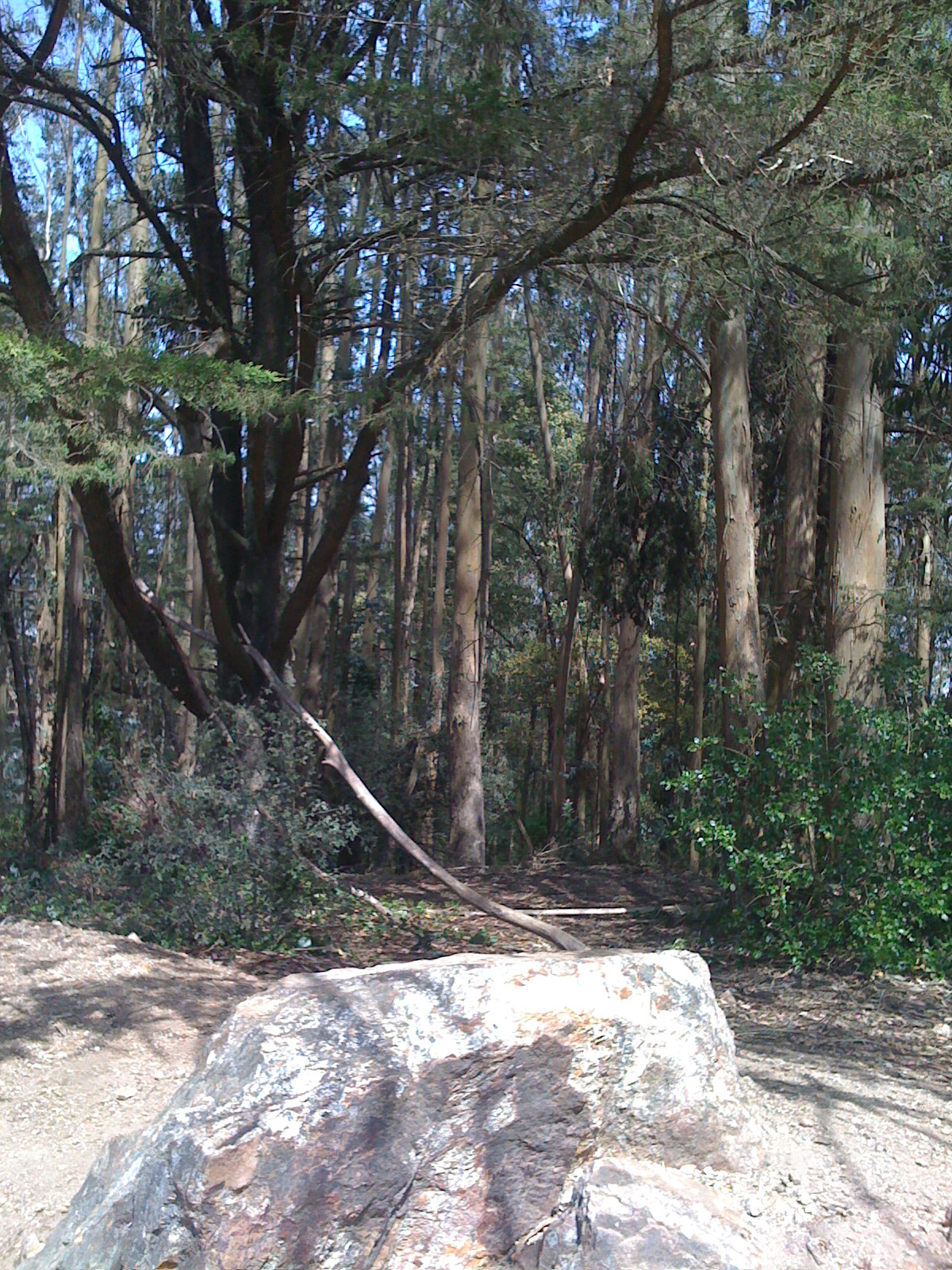
Eucalyptus trees cover much of Mount Sutro, as seen on its summit.

Mount Sutro has been covered by a dense forest, with about 80% being introduced eucalyptus trees, that was planted in the late 19th century. The older trees are now over 100 feet (30 m) tall. The mountain is within San Francisco's fog belt, receiving fog throughout the summer. The tall trees precipitate the fog, with the moisture being absorbed by the duff and tree roots, and the forest remains damp through the summer months. It receives some 30 to 40% of its moisture from fog drip. There is a dense understory of non-native Himalayan blackberry (Rubus armeniacus) and several other plants. The forest provides habitat for a number of bird species, including great horned owls and various woodpeckers. Over thirty species were recorded in a single morning of bird watching.

The 19-acre (7.7 ha) city-owned portion of Mount Sutro and the eucalyptus forest, called the Interior Green Belt, is contiguous with the UCSF-owned 61 acres (25 ha) Mount Sutro Open Space Reserve portion. The forest is bounded on the north by the UCSF Medical Center and the UCSF Stem-cell Research Building; on the west by the Sunset District; on the south by the Forest Knolls neighborhood, built in the late 1950s on cleared forest land; and on the east by the Cole Valley neighborhood.

=== Recreation ===
Rotary Meadow, a garden of California native plants, is at the summit within the Mount Sutro Open Space Reserve. It was funded by a $100,000 grant from the San Francisco Rotary Club #2 and its members in 2004. The garden is maintained by the Sutro Stewards volunteers, and has water supplied by UCSF. It is accessible by paved road from Clarendon Avenue through UCSF's Aldea San Miguel housing complex. Most of the garden's plants reach peak bloom in the spring. It is encircled by the Eucalyptus forest, and therefore has no views of the city, as the nearby non-forested Twin Peaks and Tank Hill do.

The hill and forest are accessible by hiking trails, many of which are suitable for mountain bikes. Sutro Stewards.org: Map of Mount Sutro Another access to the summit is from 7th Avenue on the west side of the mountain, climbing the 355-step public stairway from Warren Drive to Crestmont Drive (named Oakhurst Way on many maps), then turning left/north and entering the forest where Crestmont makes a sharp right/east turn.

=== Restoration and preservation ===
In 2009, UCSF applied for a grant from FEMA to remove a majority of the eucalyptus trees on 23% of its land, for campus and residential neighborhood fire safety. It was supported by native habitat restoration advocates, for the return and expansion of indigenous habitats that support native flora and fauna within the city.

Some local residents opposed the plan, so in February 2010, UCSF announced it was withdrawing its application to the Federal Emergency Management Agency, and would instead conduct a full Environmental Impact Review (EIR) under the California Environmental Quality Act (CEQA) before proceeding with plans to restore the original ecology of Mount Sutro. After over four years, the first step, a preliminary Draft EIR for public review and comments, has yet to be completed by UCSF.

== History ==
=== 19th century ===
Much of 19th century Mount Sutro was within the Rancho San Miguel of Alta California, a Mexican land grant given to Jose de Jesus Noe in 1846.

The ranch property was acquired by Adolph Sutro in 1879, shortly after his Comstock Lode stock was bought out by his partners, the "Silver Big 4." That enabled Sutro to invest in San Francisco real estate on a very large scale, at one point owning almost 10% of San Francisco's total acreage. Sutro used annual Arbor Day celebrations to plant trees (eventually thousands of them) on the rocky coastal sage and chaparral clad slopes and hollows and in sand dunes on his properties.

Sutro originally planned to develop residential neighborhoods on the hill, then named "Mount Parnassus," and on another to the east he named "Mount Olympus." The hill was later renamed Mount Sutro, in honor of Sutro who also was the 24th mayor of San Francisco, from 1894 to 1896.

In July 1895, Sutro donated a 13-acre (5.3 ha) site on the "Parnassus bench" overlooking Golden Gate Park, to serve as a campus site for the Affiliated Colleges of the University of California, the present day University of California, San Francisco Parnassus Campus. Adolph Sutro died land rich but cash poor in 1898, resulting in the settlement of his estate being long and arduous. Some plans of the Sutro Development Company were completed, including a street railway on Parnassus Boulevard that operated to serve those developments, while many others were stopped by litigation.

=== 20th century ===
With the settlement of Sutro's estate, after almost twenty years of litigation, much of the developable, eucalyptus-covered land began to be cleared around 1930, and continued through the 1960s. The city expanded westward, and the land was developed for commercial and residential needs.

Though planned as a recreational forest, some areas were logged by Sutro's heirs. In 1934, after a fire, this effort was discontinued. The forest was logged again during World War II, for use as a domestic fuel due to war rationing.

Mount Sutro itself, and most of its remaining forest, was within the 90 acres (36 ha) parcel purchased by the University of California in 1952.

== See also ==
- List of San Francisco, California Hills
- List of California native plants
- California coastal sage and chaparral ecoregion
- Coastal sage scrub
