= Corona Heights, San Francisco =

Neighborhood of San Francisco, US

Coordinates: 37°45′44.3″N 122°26′37.9″W

Corona Heights
- Neighborhood
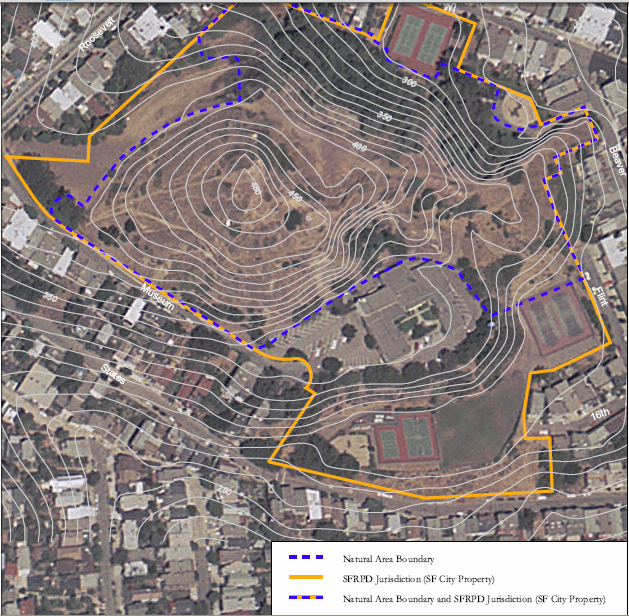
- Satellite image of the Corona Heights park from which the neighborhood takes its name.
- Interactive map of Corona Heights
- Country: United States
- State: California
- Municipality: San Francisco

Government
  - Supervisor: Rafael Mandelman
  - Assemblymember: Matt Haney (D)
  - State senator: Scott Wiener (D)
  - U.S. rep.: Nancy Pelosi (D)

Area
  - Total: 0.220 sq mi (0.57 km^{2})
  - Land: 0.220 sq mi (0.57 km^{2})

Population (2008)
  - Total: 3,500
  - Density: 15,941/sq mi (6,155/km^{2})
- ZIP Code: 94114
- Area codes: 415/628

Corona Heights is a neighborhood in San Francisco, California, just north of Market Street and Eureka Valley. Corona Heights is often considered part of the Castro and Upper Market areas.

== Location ==
The Corona Heights neighborhood stretches between Buena Vista Park and Eureka Valley. The streets within Corona Heights were literally cut out of the large hill that once encompassed all of Buena Vista Park and extended all the way down to Market Street.

== History ==
In 1899, excavation began on the hill to make way for the Gray Brothers Quarry and brick factory. The quarry had removed tons of rock and produced tens of thousands of bricks, creating a blasted landscape.

George and Harry Gray (the Gray brothers) owned a total of three quarries in San Francisco. Besides The Corona Heights Quarry, One was located on Telegraph Hill, and the third at Thirtieth and Castro (now called Billy Goat Hill) located above Noe Valley.

They had a bad reputation that was well deserved. Of the bricks that were produced at the factory, many of them were used in the Cable Car beds. Subsequently, it was determined that these bricks were substandard and had to be replaced. The community became enraged with the Gray brothers when adults and children were injured by falling rocks and homes were damaged by flying debris. Although the Gray brothers faced lawsuit after lawsuit, they kept quarrying.

In 1909, Carolyn Bush, their cashier and George Gray's secretary, was shot and killed by an unpaid worker who lost his temper. A few years later in 1915 George, by then a millionaire, was at the Thirtieth and Castro quarry. He was confronted by Joseph Lococo, a 26-year-old former worker whom Gray refused to pay back wages of $17.50. George was murdered by Lococo at the quarry. The quarrying and the company ended at that time.

=== After the quarry ===
Because of the quarry, streets had been cut out of the rock for transport vehicle access and from the general quarrying done to the area. This made the location prime real estate for people who began to build their homes on the streets cut into the hill.

Many of the neighborhood homes have views (due to the elevation on the hill), close proximity to underground transportation (MUNI), and are situated just a few blocks from The Castro, local restaurants, and neighborhood hangouts. At the top of the hill, where the quarry used to stand, there is now the Corona Heights Park: a large, open space with panoramic views of the city and the bay. Corona Heights Park also features a fenced-in, maintained dog park.

== Attractions and characteristics ==
- Corona Heights Park, a large, open space, city park, with panoramic views of the city and the bay
- Randall Museum, focuses on the arts, crafts, sciences, and natural history
- The Castro District

Corona Heights features prominently in Fritz Leiber's famous horror novel "Our Lady of Darkness" (1977).

== Gallery ==
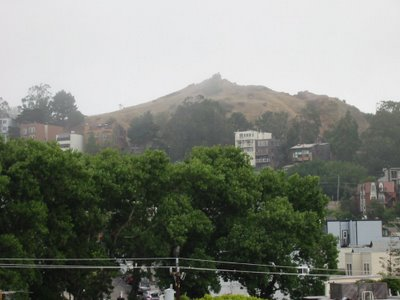
Corona Heights.

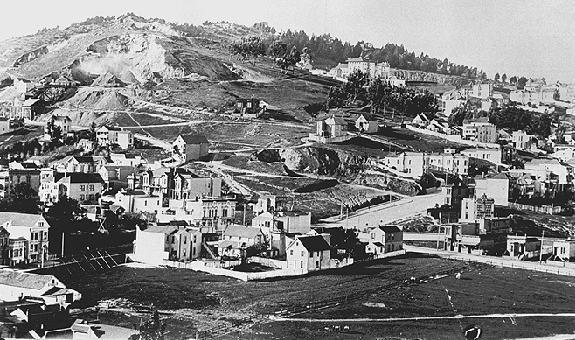
Excavation begins for the Gray Brother's Quarry in 1899.

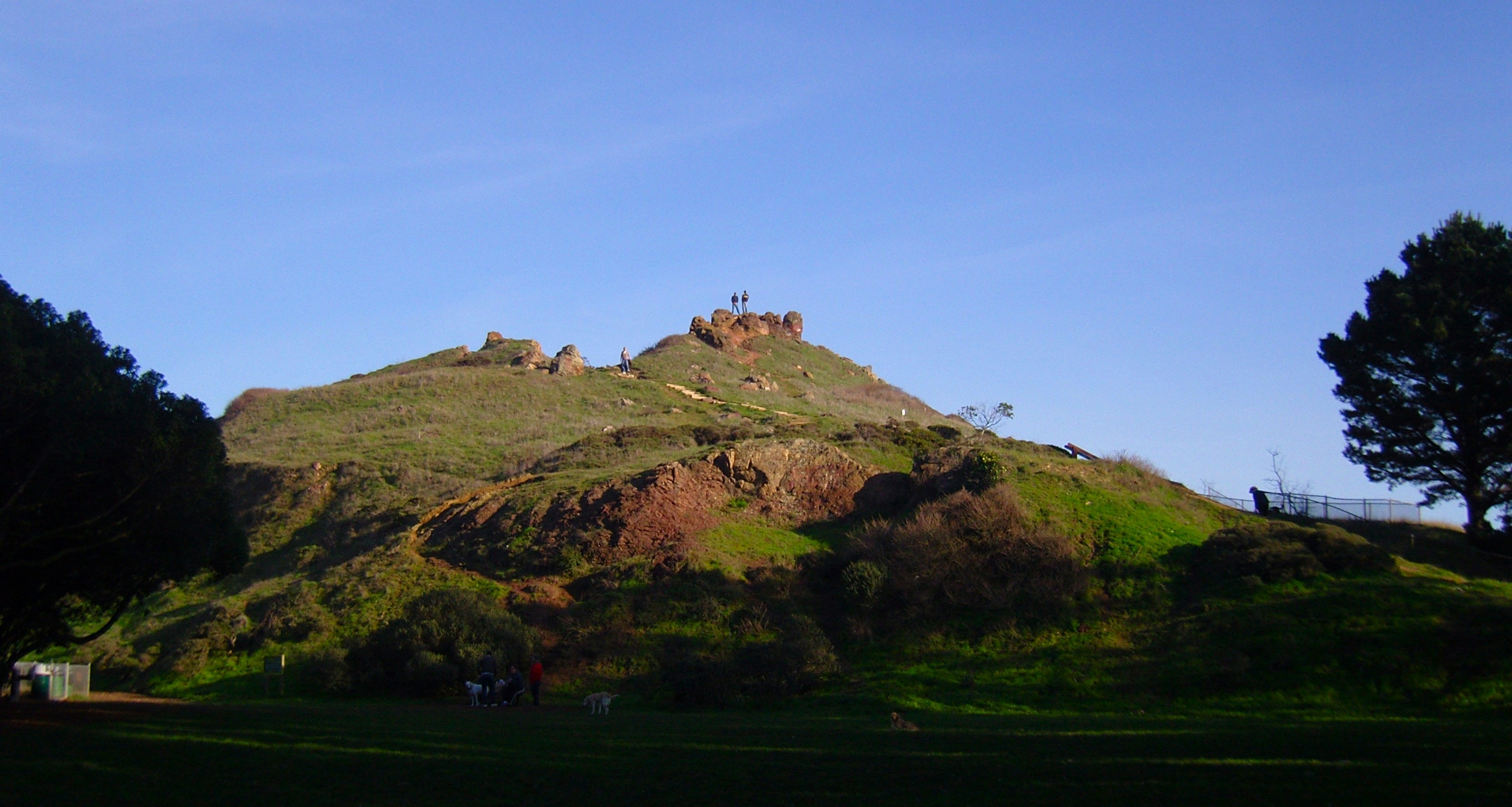
Corona Heights Park.
