= William Merchant =

William Merchant may refer to:

- William Alfred Merchant, English dwarf clown
- William Merchant (MP) for Wycombe (UK Parliament constituency)
- William Moelwyn Merchant, academic, novelist, sculptor, poet and Anglican priest
- William G. Merchant (1889–1962), Californian architect
