= Production of Sense8 =

Processes involved in the making of Sense8

Sense8 (a play on the word sensate /ˈsɛnseɪt/) is an American science fiction drama web television series created by Lana and Lilly Wachowski and J. Michael Straczynski for Netflix. The production companies behind Sense8 include the Wachowskis' Anarchos Productions (replaced by Lana and her wife's Venus Castina Productions in the second season), Straczynski's Studio JMS, and Georgeville Television, with Unpronounceable Productions having been set up specifically for this show.

The show's first season introduced a multinational ensemble cast, with Aml Ameen, Doona Bae, Jamie Clayton, Tina Desai, Tuppence Middleton, Max Riemelt, Miguel Ángel Silvestre, and Brian J. Smith portraying eight strangers from different parts of the world who suddenly become "sensates"; human beings who are mentally and emotionally linked. Freema Agyeman, Terrence Mann, Anupam Kher, Naveen Andrews, and Daryl Hannah also star. In the second season Toby Onwumere replaces Ameen. The show aims to explore subjects that its creators feel have not been emphasized in many science fiction shows to date, such as politics, identity, sexuality, gender, and religion.

All episodes of the first season of Sense8 were written by the Wachowskis and Straczynski; in the second season, Lilly Wachowski took a break from the show, and the episodes were written by just Lana Wachowski and Straczynski, with the exception of the series finale which was written by Lana, David Mitchell, and Aleksandar Hemon. Most of the episodes of the two seasons were directed by the Wachowskis (or just Lana, in the second season), with the remainder being divided between their frequent collaborators James McTeigue, Tom Tykwer, and Dan Glass. Lilly's break during the second season marked the first time in the sisters' career that they did not work together as a writing and directing unit. Sense8 was filmed almost entirely on location in a multitude of cities around the world.

== Conception ==
"We started out at one point talking about how evolution involves creating ever greater circles of empathy: You belong to your family, then you belong to your tribe, then two tribes link up and now you have empathy for your people on this side of the river, and you're against the people on the other side of the river ... on and on through villages, cities, states and nations ... So what if a more literal form of empathy could be triggered in eight individuals around the planet ... who suddenly became mentally aware of each other, able to communicate as directly as if they were in the same room. How would they react? What would they do? ... What does it mean? And what would the world think about people with this ability? Would they embrace it, or hunt them down ... ? It would give us a perfect platform to do a show that was loaded with action, big ideas, some amazing stunts that no one's done before, and play to a planetary audience."

— J. Michael Straczynski, co-creator

According to the Wachowskis, the origins of Sense8 date back several years before the announcement of the show to "a late-night conversation about the ways technology simultaneously unites and divides us". J. Michael Straczynski recalls that when the Wachowskis decided to create their first series, because of Straczynski's extensive experience working with the format, Lana chose to invite him to her house in San Francisco to brainstorm ideas together. Both the Wachowskis and Straczynski agreed that if they were to do a television series, they wanted to attempt something that "nobody had done before", and change the "vocabulary for television production" the same way The Matrix became a major influence for action movies. After several days of discussion they decided on creating a show that would explore the relationship between empathy and evolution in the human race, and whose story would be told in a global scale, necessitating filming on location in several countries over the world, in contrast to the standard production model for television which attempts to limit or fake that as much as possible. A source of inspiration for Straczynski was his own experience concerning friends of his who live in different parts of the world but coordinate to watch a movie at the same time and comment to each other online about it.

The title of the show was thought up by Lana on their second day of brainstorming, during a time when they hadn't yet decided how many characters they were going to have. Lana appeared to Straczynski with a notebook with the word "Sense8" written in it, as a play on the word sensate and the notion of eight main characters, telling him "The hard part is over now!".

== Development ==
=== Pitch ===
The trio became so excited with the concept they came up with, they decided to do initial development on their own instead of pitching it to someone else. The Wachowskis wrote three hour-long spec scripts, and together with Straczynski attempted to shop them around, such as at Warner Bros. and HBO, but when they saw that nobody could understand the concept they decided to shelve it. A few years later, when they felt that the landscape of television had become friendlier towards more experimental concepts, they decided to pitch it a second time. On October 2, 2012, Variety first reported the existence of the show, by writing that the Wachowskis, with the help of Straczynski's Studio JMS and Georgeville Television, would be shopping Sense8 around Los Angeles the week to follow. If the series was picked up, the sisters and Straczynski would be sharing showrunner duties. Additionally, the Wachowskis were planning to direct a few episodes of the show if their schedule permitted it.

According to Straczynski, the first meeting with potential buyers was with Netflix. The Wachowskis and Straczynski talked to them about subjects such as gender, identity, secrecy and privacy. According to Lana they pitched shooting on location all over the globe to which Netflix responded favorably, which was in contrast to the "clearly impossible" response they had received by other outlets during their earlier abortive attempt. They also told Netflix they were only interested if they had the freedom to "do anything", like "crazy psychic orgies with all sorts of different bodies" and "live births even" to which Netflix also responded positively. After the end of the meeting, despite it having seemingly gone well, they worried they had made a mistake because they had not pitched any action or otherwise commercial aspects. By noon, and before they had the chance to pitch it to other outlets, such as HBO, Netflix called them to preemptively offer to buy and produce the first season.

Netflix announced that they had ordered a 10-episode first season for the series on March 27, 2013. Later, during filming, because of the density of the scripts and the extended length of the first cut of the first episode, the showrunners and Netflix came to an agreement to extend the season to 12 episodes. The Wachowskis and Straczynski's production company that was set up to run the show was named Unpronounceable Productions. The name was suggested by Straczynski, as a joke that references the difficulty of pronouncing the showrunners' long last names.

=== Season 1 ===
Before filming began, Straczynski and the Wachowskis mapped out five seasons worth of stories for the series, including the series' final episode, similarly to what Straczynski had previously done on his Babylon 5 series. The actors cast were signed for five seasons. "We pitched it as a five-year story. We've mapped out five seasons of this thing, our actor deals are being made for five seasons, five or six depending on the breaks", said Straczynski. The first season acts as the origin story for the characters. When asked how long their story bible is, Straczynski replied "It's in our heads". However, Straczynski did compile a 30-page document detailing the key points of a hypothetical second season should the first season become a success.

Comic book artist Steve Skroce, who has been collaborating with the Wachowskis since The Matrix on both film and comic book media, created storyboards for the show. Julie Wachowski, sister to the Wachowskis, is given the credit of "story researcher" in the closing credits of each episode of the first season. Karin Winslow Wachowski, Lana's wife, is credited for researching the story starting with the second episode of the second season.

=== Season 2 ===
Lilly Wachowski, after completing her gender transition, decided to take some time off and did not return as writer or director for the second season, although she remained active as co-creator. Straczynski, who had a very active role during season 1 from pre-production to post-production in order to assist the Wachowskis with their first foray into TV, said his primary involvement in season 2 finished with the completion of the writing phase, as Lana felt this time she had the required experience to tackle the filmmaking aspect of the show on her own. He also said that the second season was designed to explore the mythology of sensates, introduce other clusters, and provide answers to many of the questions viewers had after the first season. Lana came up with the idea of making the first episode of the second season a two-hour Christmas special, because of her love for such programming in the television shows that she watched as a kid, such as Hill Street Blues, Mork & Mindy, and All My Children. Lana explained she enjoyed watching the lives of the characters in specials intersect with her own and considered birthdays, holidays and celebrations unique events for their ability to make one feel connected but also isolated and alone.

Producer Roberto Malerba has disclosed that the first season had an average budget of about $15 million per episode, and the second season $9 million per episode.

== Writing ==
Initial writing for the first season was split between the Wachowskis and Straczynski. The Wachowskis wrote episodes one, two, three, seven and eight while Straczynski wrote episodes four, five, six, nine and ten. Then the Wachowskis rewrote Straczynski's scripts and vice versa. Straczynski said a good portion of the writing was done by just Lana and himself. Straczynski believes writing with the Wachowskis helped mask each other's weaknesses and also allowed each party to learn from the other. He recognizes action and plot as their biggest strengths but structure as their weakness. On the other hand, he views himself as really good on structure but weak on action. Straczynski said the way he works is by first developing the entire script in his head, from the first sentence to the last, before sitting down to write it, while the Wachowskis begin by writing the scenes they have already developed, leaving the others they haven't figured out yet for later, while they constantly move the pieces around to see in which way they work best.

Earlier versions of the story featured a sensate from Iraq and more about Whispers, the villain of the show. The show was transformed when the writers decided to limit the storytelling, with the exception of the opening scene of the first episode, to the perspective of the eight characters. This means that every scene set in San Francisco must be about Nomi, in Chicago about Will and so on. Since the show begins with the characters not knowing what is happening to them and without being able to cut e.g. to the villains like a traditional show, the audience starts with the same questions and confusion as the characters do. As the characters slowly begin to understand more about what's happening to them over the course of several episodes, the audience does as well, at the same pace. Straczynski notes this type of writing wouldn't work if they were writing for a traditional network. "The first episode is written in a way that you could never do a pilot. With pilots you have to set up all the rules and explain everything to hook people in," said Straczynski. Instead, taking advantage of the binge-watching model Netflix promotes, the series was written as a continuous 12-hour movie, making it possible to tell the story at a different pace.

Lana Wachowski, a trans woman, has written her first transgender character in her career in the series: Nomi Marks. For that she partly used her own experiences. "It has some very intense, autobiographical scenes, and that was very difficult and surreal," said Lana. Jamie Clayton, who plays Nomi, has provided the example of a scene where a young Nomi is bullied by boys in a gym shower, as a scene that was based on experiences from Lana's life. Freema Agyeman, who plays Nomi's girlfriend Amanita, has shared that her character was based heavily on Lana's wife, Karin Winslow. Straczynski has stated that (much like Lana's fondness towards the Nomi character) he felt close to Wolfgang Bogdanow, because both him and Wolfgang had a bad relationship with their respective fathers. "Wolfgang was my true north in the storytelling," said Straczynski. Straczynski did not reveal who was the character Lilly Wachowski felt the closest to during the writing process, saying it's up to her to do that. Since then, Lilly has come out as transgender too. The beginning of her transitioning process preceded the release of the first season, and Clayton had known about it early on.

Unlike the first season, where the Wachowskis and Straczynski split the number of scripts in half and worked remotely from each other (but with frequent meetings), writing for the second season was performed by Lana and Straczynski by collaborating inside a shared writers' room. The author of Cloud Atlas David Mitchell and the novelist and columnist Aleksandar Hemon worked as additional writers on the second season and were credited as "consultants"; they also made a cameo appearance in an episode as themselves. Both writers came to know and work with the Wachowskis prior to Sense8. Lana became friends with Mitchell after adapting Cloud Atlas to film with her sister and Tom Tykwer, and was very surprised to read Mitchell's The Bone Clocks shortly before shooting the first season of Sense8 to find it strongly resembled "Sense8 and Jupiter Ascending [put] together", even though they each wrote their works separately. Hemon first met the Wachowskis in 2009, when they interviewed him looking for inspiration to write a movie script they wanted, and in turn he profiled them and wrote about the making of Cloud Atlas for The New Yorker in 2012. For the second season of Sense8, Mitchell and Hemon were brought in to spend a week in September 2015 with Lana, Straczynski, and script supervisor Julie Brown, proposing to them situations, twists and turns, to be further developed by Lana and Straczynski. Afterwards and for the rest of the year, Mitchell and Hemon were regularly being tasked by Lana to write from distance select scenes on short deadlines, that she and Straczynski would further develop or reject. Hemon estimates he delivered around 120 pages, of which none made it to the second season's 700-paged script without changes. Later, once filming began, Lana did a lot of rewrites on a daily basis as she got inspired by the locations, actors, and so on, even on the set.

After completing writing for the second season, Straczynski moved on to other projects as a writer, while Mitchell and Hemon signed contracts to write for the third season over the summer of 2017. When the season was canceled by Netflix and later replaced by a special, Lana, Mitchell and Hemon returned as writers. Working 12–14 hours a day for six days per week, the three of them developed an outline within a week, and a 160-paged "writers' cut" of the completed script within three. Another week later they had it cut down to 130 pages and sent to the crew to begin pre-production, and some time later the actors received the final version, further revised and shortened, but with the ending omitted. The final 15 pages were delivered to each of them in a sealed envelope during the table read for the episode, with instructions to not open it before they are told to, so that they all get to read it for the first time together. The script during the table read bears the title "Amor Vincit Omnia", named after a famous Caravaggio painting, which translates to "Love Conquers All".

== Casting ==
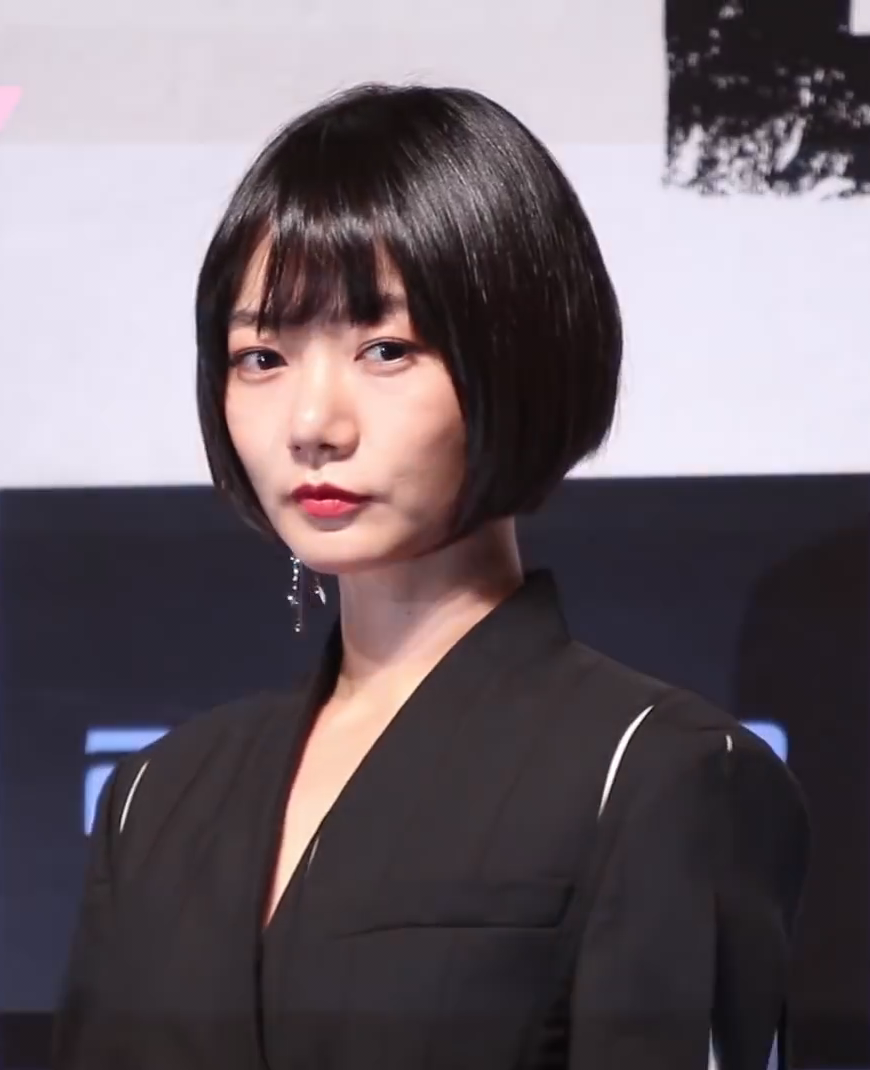
Sense8 marks the third collaboration of South Korean actress Doona Bae with the Wachowskis, following Cloud Atlas and Jupiter Ascending.

On June 20, 2014, Deadline Hollywood announced the cast of the eight lead characters, along with Freema Agyeman, Naveen Andrews, Daryl Hannah, Alfonso Herrera and Eréndira Ibarra. For the roles of those characters living outside of America, the filmmakers wanted to assemble a cast of international actors that matched the nationality of their respective characters, if possible. For example, Doona Bae, Tina Desai, and Max Riemelt are from Seoul, Mumbai, and Berlin like their respective characters. Because the eight leads share the same birthday, the actors selected were all somewhere between mid-20s and mid-30s. The filmmakers wanted to write a Chinese, Japanese or Korean character and since the Wachowskis had worked with Bae on Cloud Atlas and Jupiter Ascending before, they decided on creating a Korean character for her. Bae expressed worry to them on signing on Sense8 because the proposed five-season plan could mean she would have to be able to film action scenes for the next 10 years, which would be difficult if she ever decided to get married and got pregnant. She joined the cast after the showrunners told her not to worry as they would kill off her character for her if that ever happened. Jamie Clayton is a trans woman like the character she plays. She was attracted to Sense8 because of the opportunity to play a transgender character that was written and directed by a transgender filmmaker, and because she was a fan of science fiction and Straczynski. Tuppence Middleton knew the Wachowskis were writing Sense8 while working with them on Jupiter Ascending but she did not think they would ask her to play a role. Max Riemelt was cast at the recommendation of director Tom Tykwer, who had been wanting to work with the actor for a long time. Daryl Hannah was brought in to read for Whispers, because they were thinking of making him an androgynous character at the time, but when she arrived she was told they'd like her to read for the role of Angelica. In November, Deadline Hollywood wrote than Christian Oliver had joined the cast as a recurring villain. Oliver said he was excited to play a villain for the Wachowskis for a second time, after Speed Racer. Joe Pantoliano, who previously played in the Wachowskis' Bound and The Matrix, was cast in a small uncredited role as Will's father.

On April 26, 2016, Deadline Hollywood reported that Aml Ameen abruptly left production a couple of episodes into filming of the second season over a conflict with Lana Wachowski that started during the table read for the season and progressively got worse. Both the Deadline article and Ameen's co-star on Sense8, Tuppence Middleton, suggested the conflict was over creative differences. When asked about it, Straczynski commented he was not there to know what happened between Ameen and Lana but he respects the choices of both. Subsequent to Ameen's departure, the role of Capheus was recast to Toby Onwumere after a seven-day auditioning process. Onwumere watched a few episodes of the show to prepare for his audition, as he had not seen it before. The actor said about his approach to the character: "My duty [was] not to emulate exactly what [Ameen] has done, ... but just to give it my own spin, and kind of do my own thing, and just give this character the same essence, but ... maybe a different life and a different take on it." Lana described the unexpected change of the actors as "beautiful" and "perfect", commenting that it complimented her effort to explore the nature of identity in the series. She elaborated that in her opinion Ameen was an actor that was "quite good at being innocent and boyish" and Onwumere had similar qualities but was also someone that was "ready to ... become a political leader ... and also fall in love and be sort of sensual with another body", storylines that are explored in the second season of the show. Earlier in April, Kick Gurry, who had played parts in the Wachowskis' Speed Racer and Jupiter Ascending in the past, revealed he had been cast in the second season, after Lana called to inform him that they had a written a role specifically for him. In May, Deadline Hollywood reported Ben Cole had been cast as Todd, a sensate who would rather be "normal". In September, Sylvester McCoy reportedly revealed he filmed three or four episodes of the second season of a Netflix show, later identified to be Sense8, and has signed to appear in further seasons if he is wanted. Martin Wuttke, who had minor roles in Cloud Atlas, also joined the cast in the second season.

Carmen Cuba served as the casting director on the series.

== Filming and locations ==
=== Season 1 ===
To properly tell the international aspects of the story, filming for Sense8 took place almost entirely on location around the globe. In the first season they filmed in nine cities located in eight countries: Berlin, Chicago, London, Mexico City, Mumbai, Nairobi, Reykjavík, San Francisco, and Seoul.

Production began on June 18, 2014, in San Francisco. The filmmakers successfully negotiated with the organizers of the Clarion Alley Mural Project and select artists to feature their artwork in the show. Shooting in Chicago began on July 9 and wrapped up on August 8, with filming taking place both on location and at the Cinespace Film Studios. They shot some scenes in the Superdawg drive-through restaurant, while customers were being asked not to stare at the filming. Lana and Lilly Wachowski are frequent customers of the place. During location scouting, the producers found the City Methodist Church in Gary, Indiana which is nearby Chicago, and changed one site's description in the scripts to a church accordingly in order to fit that particular site into the filming. They filmed in the church from July 25 to 28.

Filming proceeded to London for a short shoot and then to Iceland, where between August 26 and September 6 they shot in Reykjavik and nearby places such as Akranes. Filming then started in Nairobi, where a sequence required a crowd of 700 extras, 200 cars and a helicopter. In Seoul they filmed from September 18 to 30. Next they moved to Mexico City and later to Germany, where they filmed in Berlin and inside Babelsberg Studio. Last place they visited was Mumbai where they also shot a Bollywood dance number that was choreographed by Slumdog Millionaire's Longinus Fernandes. The writers wanted to feature an event in each city. They were able to schedule the Pride scenes with its Dykes on Bikes on the Dyke March in San Francisco, the Fourth of July fireworks celebration in Chicago, and the Ganesha Chaturthi Hindu festival in Mumbai. Additionally they recorded footage from the Fresh Meat Festival of transgender and queer performance in San Francisco, a club event taking place at the KOKO in London, and a real lucha libre (Mexican professional wrestling) event with the fighters wearing wrestling masks in Arena Naucalpan, in Mexico City.

Lastly the scenes where characters are flying on an airplane were recorded during the real flights the cast and crew had to do to get from London to Iceland. On November 17, 2014, Straczynski wrote that the main unit shooting had wrapped, with only a few winter shots in Iceland remaining to be captured the next month. These scenes were further delayed to mid-January 2015, until Iceland had the necessary amount of snow, with the wrap party taking place in Reykjavík's Harpa Music and Concert hall on January 21, 2015. By the end of the shooting, the filmmakers had completed 100,000 miles of flight time, or four times around the globe.

=== Season 2 ===
For the second season, production credited 16 cities located in 11 countries for having been part of the filming. The major locations they filmed in, include all of the first season's except Reykjavík, and the following new ones: Amsterdam, Argyll, Chippenham, Los Angeles, Malta, Positano, Redwoods, and São Paulo. Production start for the main unit of the second season was given an expected date of March 2016, but a separate shoot involving the principal actors began on December 30, 2015, in Berlin, to capture footage during the Christmas holidays. This was followed by a short two-day shoot in Chicago, on January 23 and 24, 2016.

Filming resumed in Berlin in the middle of March 2016, and proceeded to Mumbai on March 25, for a 10-day shoot. On April 7, filming started in Positano. Aml Ameen did not participate in the filming, as he had decided to depart from the production. Later in April, filming moved to Mexico, with Toby Onwumere replacing the departed Ameen, and specifically to Mexico City, and for one day in Metepec. Filming in California, San Francisco, began around May 5, and lasted up to May 20. Location manager Matthew Riutta was fined by the Department of Parks and Recreation when "someone accidentally got naked", during a romantic scene set at the tree swing in Billy Goat Hill. A short two-day shoot in Los Angeles, Malibu followed, starting May 24. Filming in São Paulo took place in late May, and specifically in its 20th Gay Pride Parade on May 29. Participating in the event was a late decision taken by Lana two days before the Parade began, as the production had previously abandoned their plans for the location due to scheduling conflicts. When Lana realized she could make it fit, they flew to São Paulo and filmed in the event in front of a crowd of millions, unrehearsed.

Filming in Chicago began on June 5, and wrapped up on June 15, then moved to the United Kingdom, in London, Cambridge (Chippenham Park), and Scotland (Ardkinglas Estate and Castle Stalker, for 9 days), and wrapped on July 4. Then, filming moved to the Netherlands, in Amsterdam, The Hague, and Utrecht, for about two weeks, up to July 19. In Amsterdam, they were the first production to film in the Rijksmuseum, with the real paintings of Rembrandt featured prominently in the scenes. Lana was told that insurance would never allow her to film there, but after writing an eight-page letter about what The Night Watch means to her and the importance of bringing art to the homes of those that are unable to go to Rijksmuseum, she eventually managed to get a permit. In Amsterdam's club Paradiso, they filmed Tuppence Middleton DJing with a real audience, and the rest of the cast dancing.

After the Netherlands, filming proceeded to Nairobi as early as July 22, and later to South Korea, in Seoul and Bucheon, for the production's longest shoot, lasting about three weeks. Afterwards, filming moved to Berlin, until September 14, and during the same period, they also briefly returned to London to shoot outside the Houses of Parliament for two days. Filming then moved to Malta on September 18, for a two-day shoot, where they used the water tanks in Kalkara. On September 19, 2016, with the completion of the Malta shoot, filming for the second season came to an end. Overall, the cast and crew flew in excess of 250,000 miles to complete the season, while some directors and producers who also did location scouting flew as much as 370,000 miles.

Filming for the second special took place in Berlin, Brussels, Naples, and Paris. Production began in Berlin on October 2, 2017, and moved to Brussels on October 12, where they filmed in Villers Abbey in Villers-la-Ville. The next day filming began in Paris, where they remained up to October 24. Around midnight of October 22, they filmed a four-minute fireworks show near the Eiffel Tower. Due to insufficient notices posted by the Paris City Hall, reportedly some Parisians were taken by surprise and mistook the sound of the fireworks for a terrorist attack. On October 25 production moved to Naples where it remained up to November 4. They donated €7,000 to the local community to thank them for the hospitality, and to fund the construction of a pedestrian plaza. Filming resumed in Berlin later in November, and wrapped on November 12, 2017. A picture of the clapperboard used by the production shows that they consider the special as the twelfth episode of season 2.

== Directing ==
The show's directors were attached to locations instead of episodes and with several countries appearing in every episode, in reality none of them has a singular director. During the first season the Wachowskis were responsible for directorial duties in scenes shot in Chicago and San Francisco along with London and Iceland, two places which were initially announced to be helmed by Straczynski. Straczynski eventually opted to offer them to the siblings because of the extensive action scenes involved in those locations and instead focused his energy on post-production. James McTeigue (V for Vendetta, Ninja Assassin) worked on the Mexico City and Mumbai parts along with some in Reykjavík and German director Tom Tykwer (Cloud Atlas), whose Nairobi Half Life production impressed the Wachowskis, helmed Berlin and Nairobi. Dan Glass, who had been the visual effects supervisor for every Wachowski film since The Matrix Reloaded, reprised his role in Sense8 while also making his directorial debut in the Seoul part of the story. Even though there were times that units located in different countries were simultaneously shooting, the Wachowskis would travel to the various locations and have collaborations with the attached directors. Reportedly the Wachowskis directed such segments in locations where a different director was otherwise attached as the stunts the character of Silvestre performed for his action movie in Mexico City and in Nairobi car chase scenes with the "Van Damn" bus along with a fight scene involving machetes. In total, the Wachowskis were credited for directing seven episodes, McTeigue and Tykwer two each, and Glass one. During filming of the first season of Sense8 the Wachowskis were shooting ten to fifteen pages a day, which was much faster than the two to three pages a day pace they were used to on the typical large budget film. They commented it put a lot of pressure on them, but Lilly also called it exciting learning how to adapt to it. Tykwer said he had to be moving at a pace of completing seven minutes per day, which he similarly found highly unusual coming from the world of film.

In the second season, Lana Wachowski took over many of the filmmaking aspects of the show, which combined with her sister's break, made her responsibilities as director shoot up. Production sound mixer Stevie Haywood recounted Lana's directing style was to use two cameras as the default setup, and develop the shot over "enormously long takes" which could last up to fifteen to twenty minutes. Additionally, the cast and crew under Lana did not use any rehearsals. "We rehearse on camera effectively", said Haywood. If there were any technical issues Lana expected the cast to improvise and keep the shoot going instead of calling "cut". Smith, Desai and Silvestre corroborated Lana's style of developing the shots on the set, her dislike for rehearsals, and the use of long takes, with the actors told to try different variations on how they play their parts. McTeigue returned as director for Mexico City. Tykwer returned as director for the Nairobi parts but not for the Berlin ones, as he was busy working on his own TV series, Babylon Berlin. According to Glass, in the second season he directed the second unit in Seoul, and he also did some directing in Berlin. Overall, six episodes of the second season, including the Christmas special, credit Lana as director, three credit McTeigue, and Tykwer and Glass get credited each in one.

Lana returned as the main director of the series' second special, and Tykwer collaborated with her in Berlin.

== Cinematography ==
Netflix required the production to shoot with 4K cameras to make the look of the show future-proof and John Toll who is credited as the main director of photography for overseeing the distinct look of the nine featured locations, made the decision to shoot by using mostly Sony's CineAlta PMW-F55 cameras, paired with Carl Zeiss Ultra Prime and Cooke Optics S4 lenses. During the first season, Toll, once again collaborating with the Wachowskis and Glass after Cloud Atlas and Jupiter Ascending, personally handled the cinematography in San Francisco, Chicago, London, Iceland, and Seoul. Toll's approach to shooting was to use a lot of Steadicam and hand-held partly out of the necessity to follow the faster schedule of a television production compared to the feature films he was used to working on. Additional cinematographers worked with the rest of the directors in the remaining locations and they used a similar shooting style because they were facing the same scheduling challenges. McTeigue's cinematographer of choice for shooting in Mexico City and Mumbai was Danny Ruhlmann, who previously shot The Raven and Survivor for him. Tykwer worked with Frank Griebe and Christian Almesberger for the Berlin and Nairobi scenes respectively. Griebe had previously shot seven feature films of Tykwer's including Cloud Atlas and Almesberger was the cinematographer of two films Tykwer had produced in Nairobi: Soul Boy and Nairobi Half Life.

In the second season, production used again mostly F55 cameras, paired with Panavision Primo 11:1 zoom, Carl Zeiss Ultra Prime, and Fujinon 19-90mm Cabrio Premier lenses. Ruhlmann returned to work with McTeigue in Mexico City, Almesberger with Tykwer in Nairobi, and Toll with Lana Wachowski in all the remaining locations. They used a two camera setup (A and B), with the first being nearly all of the time Steadicam, and the second being hand-held all the time. Toll explained this setup was necessitated by both their tight schedule and large volume of the material, but also by Lana's commitment to stay with the A camera operator, Daniele Massaccesi, and make choices as they were filming. Toll further commented on their approach: "We adopted a system of shooting traditional wide master shots and, during the course of the shot, gracefully moving into other angles and even close-ups at times. Essentially, we were often doing masters and coverage within the same take." Toll's cinematography in the third episode of the second season, "Obligate Mutualisms", was recognized with a nomination for Outstanding Cinematography for a Single-Camera Series (One Hour) during the 69th Primetime Creative Arts Emmy Awards.

Toll returned as cinematographer for the series' second special, teaming up again with Lana.

== Effects and post-production ==
External videos
- A behind-the-scenes clip taken from the documentary Sense8: Creating the World shows how the Wachowskis achieved most of the various telepathy scenes through clever camera placement and editing, without the use of visual effects.

Seoul unit director Dan Glass and Jim Mitchell were the visual effects supervisors of the first season. The season had a total VFX shot count of about 1200. An in-house VFX team was established in Chicago which completed over 700 shots. The major external VFX vendors were Locktix VFX (160-180 shots), Technicolor VFX (over 100 shots) and Encore VFX. Additional work was done by Studio 8 FX, Trace VFX and Almost Gold. Because of the series' tight budget and timeline the production made the decision to do most of the effects in-camera and only enhance them digitally where appropriate. In fact for a great number of shots which involved the sensates communicating and visiting each other telepathically the cast were simply moving in and out of the frame in timely fashion requiring no additional work. According to Glass, most of the VFX work that was done is invisible in the final show and consisted mostly of split-screens, crew and rig removal, weather augmentation and screen inserts. Executive producer Grant Hill commented he would be impressed if one would be able to recognize as many as 150 of the 1200 VFX shots, because most of them consisted of small things used to help the narrative, and they do not call attention to themselves. Of the more visible work done, Glass provided the examples of age manipulation of actors, dramatic enhancement of the weather in the car scenes in Iceland, a few greenscreens, and computer generated blades, blood and wounds.

Technicolor provided dailies and worked with cinematographer John Toll and the Wachowskis to color grade the show giving it a look which colorist Tony Dustin describes as "both real and surreal, with a slightly elevated color-saturation". The Wachowskis made the mandate for production to not "lock reels", as it is typically done on TV shows, but instead be able to tinker editorially with the series' narrative, look and tone up to two weeks before release. They also wanted the color grading of the series to be done in the da Vinci Resolve software and be of theatrical feature film quality. Technicolor finished the show in 4K and delivered both 2K and 4K resolution masters.

In the second season, the visual effects supervisors were Dan Glass and Ryan Urban, the latter of whom held the title of digital effects supervisor during the first season. Technicolor were again responsible for managing dailies and color grading the show, while their VFX department delivered over 600 shots this time around.

Sense8 was edited in the Wachowskis' headquarters in Chicago, Kinowerks, by Joe Hobeck and Joseph Jett Sally in the first season and by Sally and Fiona Colbeck in the second. Sally previously worked with the Wachowskis as first assistant editor on Speed Racer and editor on Ninja Assassin. The Wachowskis found editing a TV show to be a challenging process because of the required fast turnaround times. Lilly commented that for a feature film they get a minimum of ten weeks for editing as mandated by the Directors Guild of America, while for the first season of Sense8 they had to be moving at a pace of completing two 1-hour episodes (roughly the equivalent of a feature film) every two weeks.

== Music ==
External videos
- The title theme of Sense8 was written by composers Johnny Klimek and Tom Tykwer, and was recognized with a Primetime Emmy Award for Outstanding Original Main Title Theme Music nomination in the 2016 ceremony.

The score of Sense8 was composed by Johnny Klimek and Tom Tykwer; the two had previously co-composed the score for Cloud Atlas and had a minor contribution in the soundtrack of The Matrix Revolutions as part of Pale 3. Responsible for the orchestration was their fellow Cloud Atlas collaborator Gene Pritsker, and the recording was done by the MDR Leipzig Radio Symphony Orchestra. Each season's score was written up to a year and a half before filming began, enabling the production to play it back to the actors before shooting a scene. Tykwer, who has made the music for all of his movies this way, introduced to the Wachowskis the concept of first writing the music during pre-production of Cloud Atlas and the sisters have since commented they are not making a movie again a different way. Once a first cut is completed by the editors, the composers do further developing of their tracks. "We flesh things out; both expand and refine, write new material and even change direction if it is prudent", the composers have explained.

The theme music of Sense8 was picked by the Wachowskis from the two hours of original music Tykwer and Klimek had written. It was shortened from its original seven or eight minutes and a choir and electronic elements were added to it at the wish of the Wachowskis. The show received a nomination for Outstanding Original Main Title Theme Music during the 68th Primetime Creative Arts Emmy Awards.

Ethan Stoller, frequent collaborator of the Wachowskis is credited with composing additional music and also being the series' music editor. Long time Klimek and Tykwer collaborator Gabriel Isaac Mounsey is credited as additional score composer for the series and as one of the score mixers in the second season.

The title of the first season's fourth episode, "What's Going On?", refers to lyrics in the song "What's Up?" by the 4 Non Blondes, which was played in the episode during the main characters' first shared experience together. A soundtrack album for the first season was released digitally by WaterTower Music on May 5, 2017. It includes 10 tracks by Klimek and Tykwer, and the licensed songs "What's Up?", "Kettering" by The Antlers, "Keep It Close" by Seven Lions and featuring Kerli, and "Dauðalogn" by Sigur Rós. Klimek and Tykwer's compositions alone, are also available on WaterTower's YouTube channel. Klimek commented on his and Tykwer's collaboration with the Wachowskis for the first season's score: "We would often just do a one-week mad writing session. It's a very collaborative process, and there's no ego involved." Lana Wachowski called the score "its own unique script and it transports the viewer into the world of Sense8 in ways neither words nor images can".

For the second season, Klimek and Tykwer provided to the editorial about 10 "mother" themes, each with a length of over five minutes, before filming began. This time around, Lana experimented more with combining original and source music while working with Mounsey, who in the last episode of the season was credited as composer, along with Klimek and Tykwer. In the Christmas special episode "Happy F*cking New Year", a cover of Leonard Cohen's "Hallelujah" is featured, which was arranged by Gary Fry and recorded by the Apollo Chorus of Chicago, with the lead vocalist being Daniel Martin Moore. The sequence, which depicts the San Francisco Gay Men's Chorus singing, was originally cut to a different cover of the song, but days before the deadline of completion the licensing deal fell through, and Stoller had to order a custom version to be conducted to match their completed cut. The song was ready in five days, and the producers were happy with the result, including Netflix, which made the song a prominent feature of the special's marketing campaign. For the fifth episode of the season, "Fear Never Fixed Anything", Mounsey created a remix of "What's Up?" to be played by Riley in a club, recalling the first season's appearance of the song.

== Title sequence ==
For the series' almost two-minute long title sequence, Karin Winslow rented a car and with the help of a camera assistant traveled in the eight featured countries of the first season and captured over a hundred shots. "My directive from Lana was to go out and describe each country by what you see; find the nuances, find the food, find what people are doing, get a feel for the place," said Winslow. For the second season, and again for the finale, some of the footage was replaced by new shots, including a shot of the Wachowskis' parents. The closing credits of each episode credit Winslow for the "main title design".

== Cancellation and revival ==
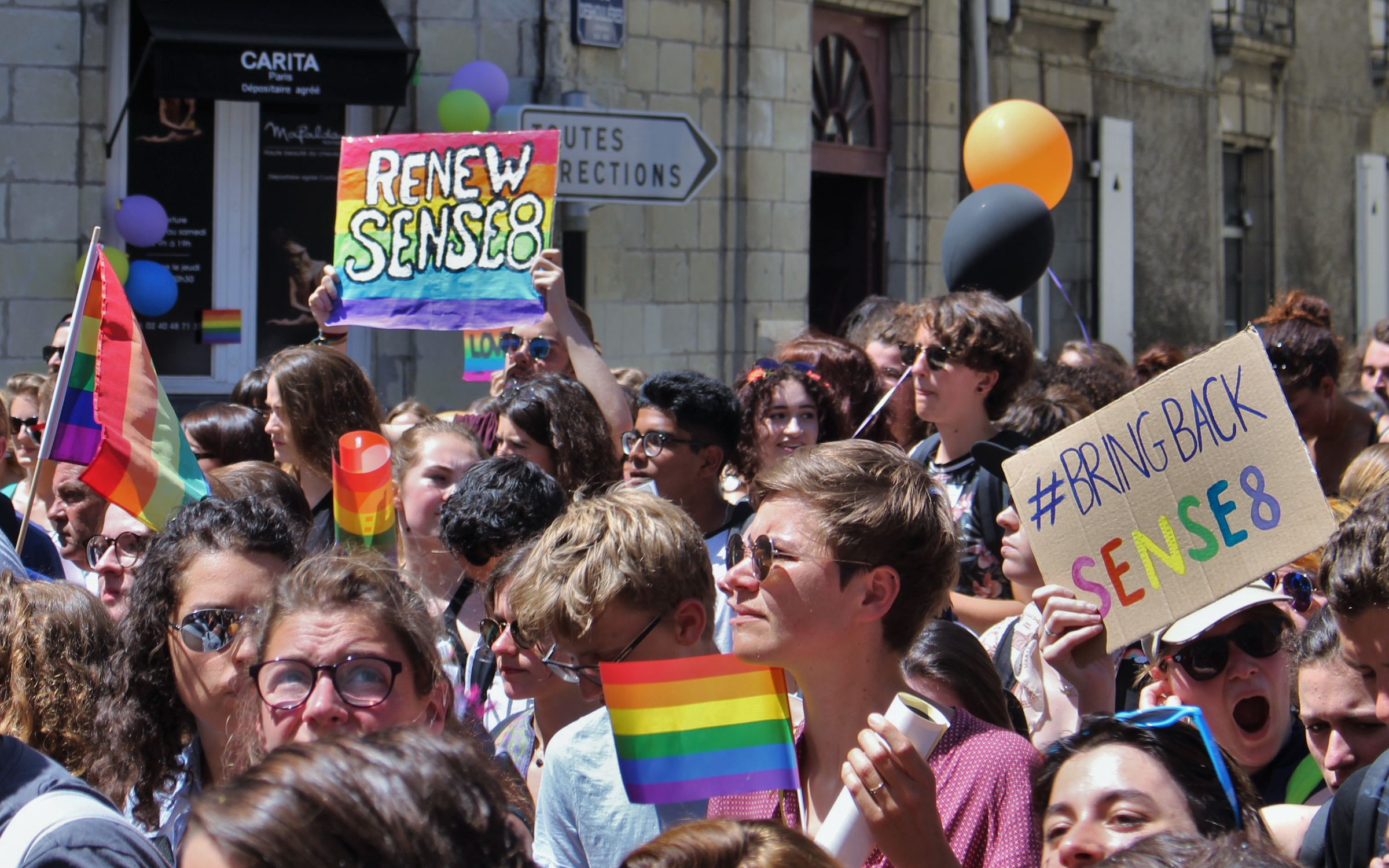
Sense8 fans marching during the Gay Pride of Nantes, France, with signs about reverting the show's cancellation.

On March 2, 2017, Deadline Hollywood reported that Netflix was in the process of renewing the lapsed contracts of the series' eight leading actors, to keep them available until June of the same year, suggesting that a positive decision to renew Sense8 for a third season before that time passed was highly possible. In early May 2017, producer Malerba said that not all eight regulars of the cast had renewed yet, but the process was still going. Furthermore, he added that a potential third season would likely be the series' last, because of the complicated nature of the series' production, and the fact that starting with the second season Lana Wachowski worked as a filmmaker on it almost alone. On June 1, 2017, Netflix announced they had cancelled the series after two seasons. Shortly later within the month, Chief Content Officer of Netflix Ted Sarandos during his talk on Produced By Conference, commented that the show was cancelled because its audience, despite being very passionate, wasn't large enough to support the high production costs to travel and film around the globe.

As a response to the cancellation, fans created online petitions, called Netflix, and tweeted #RenewSense8 and other hashtags, in an attempt to bring back the show. On June 8, 2017, the show's social media accounts acknowledged the fans' efforts, and wrote that Netflix looked into the renewal of Sense8 a second time, however they concluded it wasn't possible. The next day, actor Brian J. Smith released a letter to the fans reiterating the reason for the cancellation was low viewership and thanking Netflix and the fans for their support.

Despite Netflix confirming multiple times within the month that there was nothing they could do for the show to return, fans continued to heavily campaign for it. On June 29, 2017, the official social media accounts of the show posted a letter by Lana Wachowski which announced the release of a two-hour special targeting 2018. In her letter, Lana confessed the show's cancellation had made her fall into depression, and thanked the fans, writing that it's only thanks to their strong collective voice that the show's revival was made possible. She also acknowledged the logistics of the show have always been challenging for Netflix. In August 2017, Sarandos said that at first Lana had rejected Netflix's offer of a two-hour special, as her preference was to continue with a new season. She eventually agreed to it, having been influenced by the fans asking for more. A final running time of 151 minutes was reported later.

== Future ==
Netflix billed the second special in their announcement as the series finale, but Lana left open the future of Sense8 past the special's release, writing about it, "if this experience has taught me anything, you NEVER know". On August 5, 2017, during a Facebook Live with Lana and the cast about the show's revival, Lana joked that because she believed that the fans of the show would go and create more fans, she was writing the entire third season. Few days later, Smith said during an interview that he believed if "a truly eyebrow-raising amount of people" watched the special, they would make more. In October, actor Alfonso Herrera said both Lana and the cast want to make more so he's hopeful that the special won't be the end of the series.

In mid-August 2017, porn site xHamster wrote an open letter to the Wachowskis, offering to produce the third season, and a few days later received a call from Lana to whom they proposed to be the distribution platform. Screen Rant has criticized Xhamster's move as one of the many publicity stunts that porn companies set out to do to advertise themselves, while Inverse wrote the Wachowskis would never take their show to a platform that uses pejoratives to refer to transgender people.
