= Corona Heights Park =

Park in San Francisco, California, US

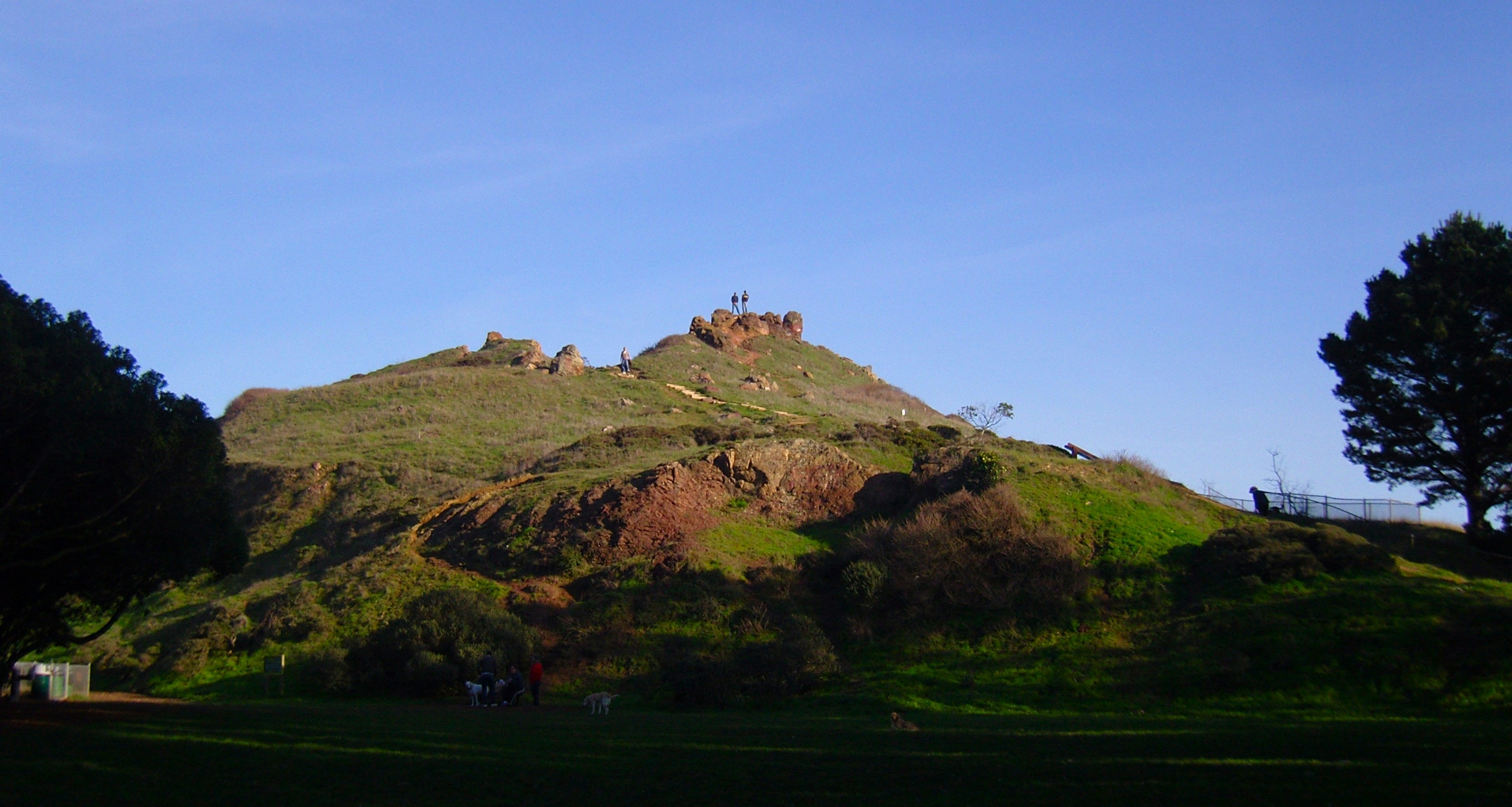
- Street view of Corona Heights Park
- Interactive map of Corona Heights Park
- Type: Municipal (San Francisco)
- Location: San Francisco
- Coordinates: 37°45′53″N 122°26′21″W
- Area: 13.2 acres (5.3 ha; 0.0206 mi^{2}; 0.053 km^{2})
- Owner: San Francisco Recreation & Parks Department
- Operator: San Francisco Recreation & Parks Department
- Open: All year, 5 a.m. to Midnight

Corona Heights Park is a public park in the Castro and Corona Heights neighborhoods of San Francisco, California, United States. It is situated immediately to the south of Buena Vista Park. Corona Heights is 13.2-acre (5.3 ha) and is bounded in part by Flint Street on the east, Roosevelt Way to the north, and 16th Street to the south. The base of the hill is at approximately 300 feet (91 m), while the peak extends to 520 feet (160 m) above sea level.

Corona Heights Playground and the Randall Museum are located within the Corona Heights Park. The whole area is underlain by Franciscan chert bedrock, and a large percentage of the hill is barren. At the hilltop, the chert bedrock in terra cotta red is clearly visible. The steps leading up to the peak are not supported by handrails. The peak of the hill is windy, but it offers an unobstructed panoramic view of the city of San Francisco from downtown to the Twin Peaks.

== Natural history ==
Portions of Corona Heights park are made up of native plant communities protected under the natural areas program as well as non-local plants. The park is home to native reptiles, including northern and southern alligator lizards and garter snakes. Butterflies like the anise swallowtail, red admiral and cabbage white can be seen flying in the park. Red-tailed hawks and common ravens can be seen over the park on most days. California scrub jays, mourning doves, downy woodpeckers, chestnut-backed chickadees, pygmy nuthatches, bushtits, American robins, California towhees, white-crowned sparrows, dark-eyed juncos, American goldfinches, and house finches nest in or near the park.

== History ==
The property has been known as Rocky Hill or Rock Hill, and the Fist (from the upthrusting chert rock boulders at its 540 feet (160 m) peak). In the 1800s, Rock Hill was the site of a quarry and brick factory, which were closed by the 1920s.

In 1928, Josephine Randall, the Superintendent of Recreation for the San Francisco Recreation & Parks Department, proposed that the City buy the 16 acres of Rock Hill for recreation. In 1941, it was purchased for $27,333 and officially named Corona Heights.

== Images ==
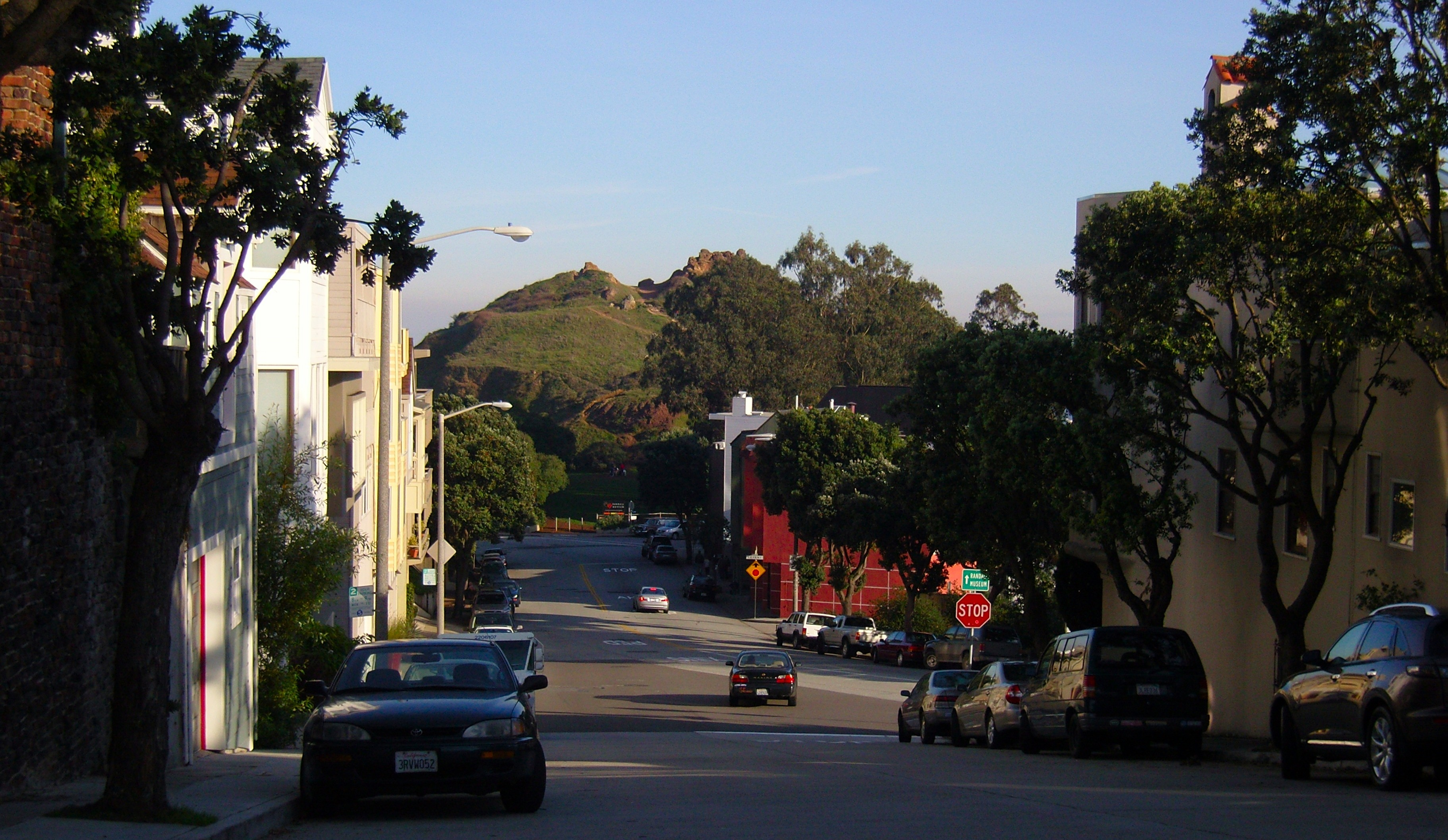
View of the park from Roosevelt Way

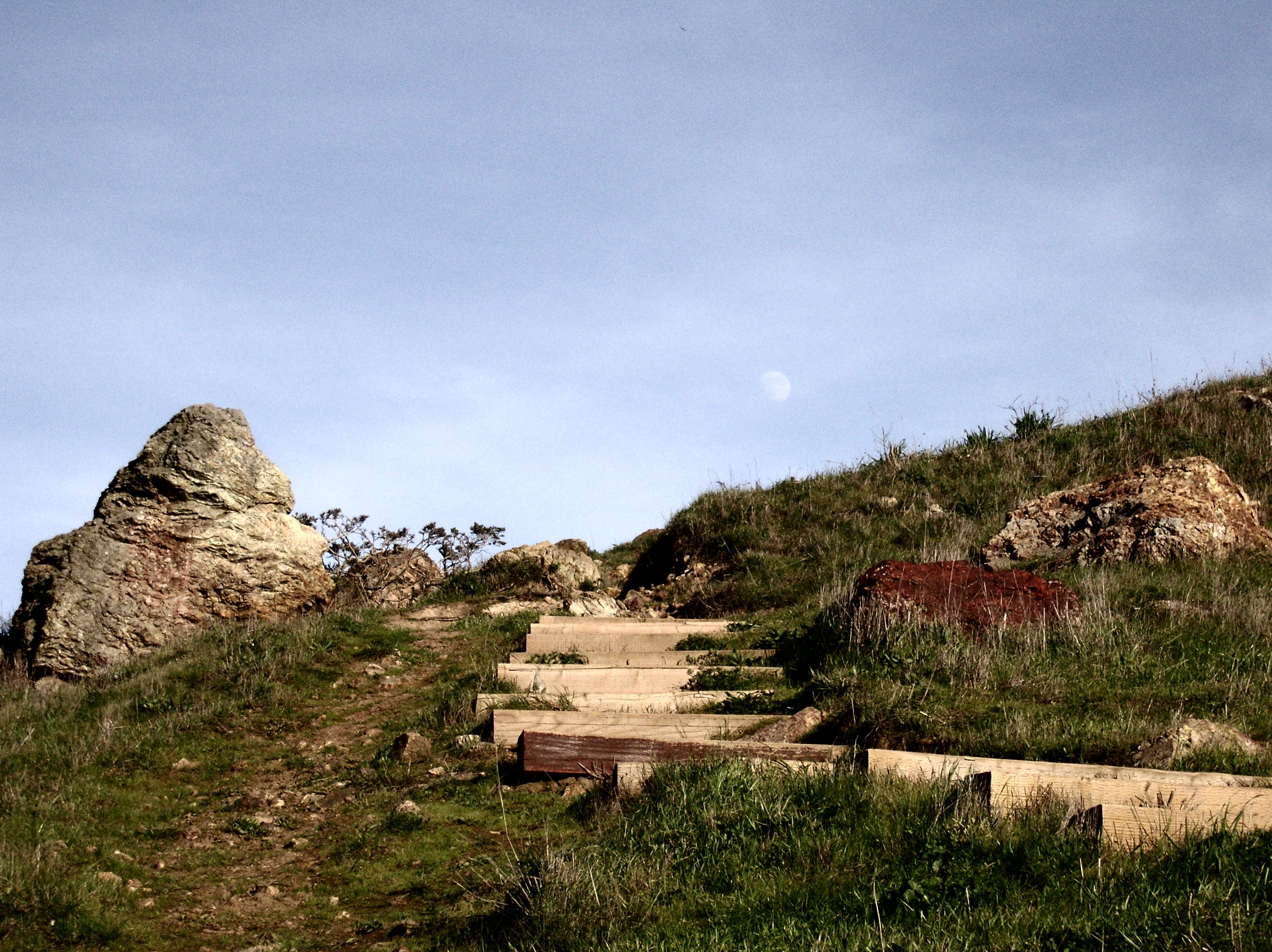
Steps leading up to the top of the hill

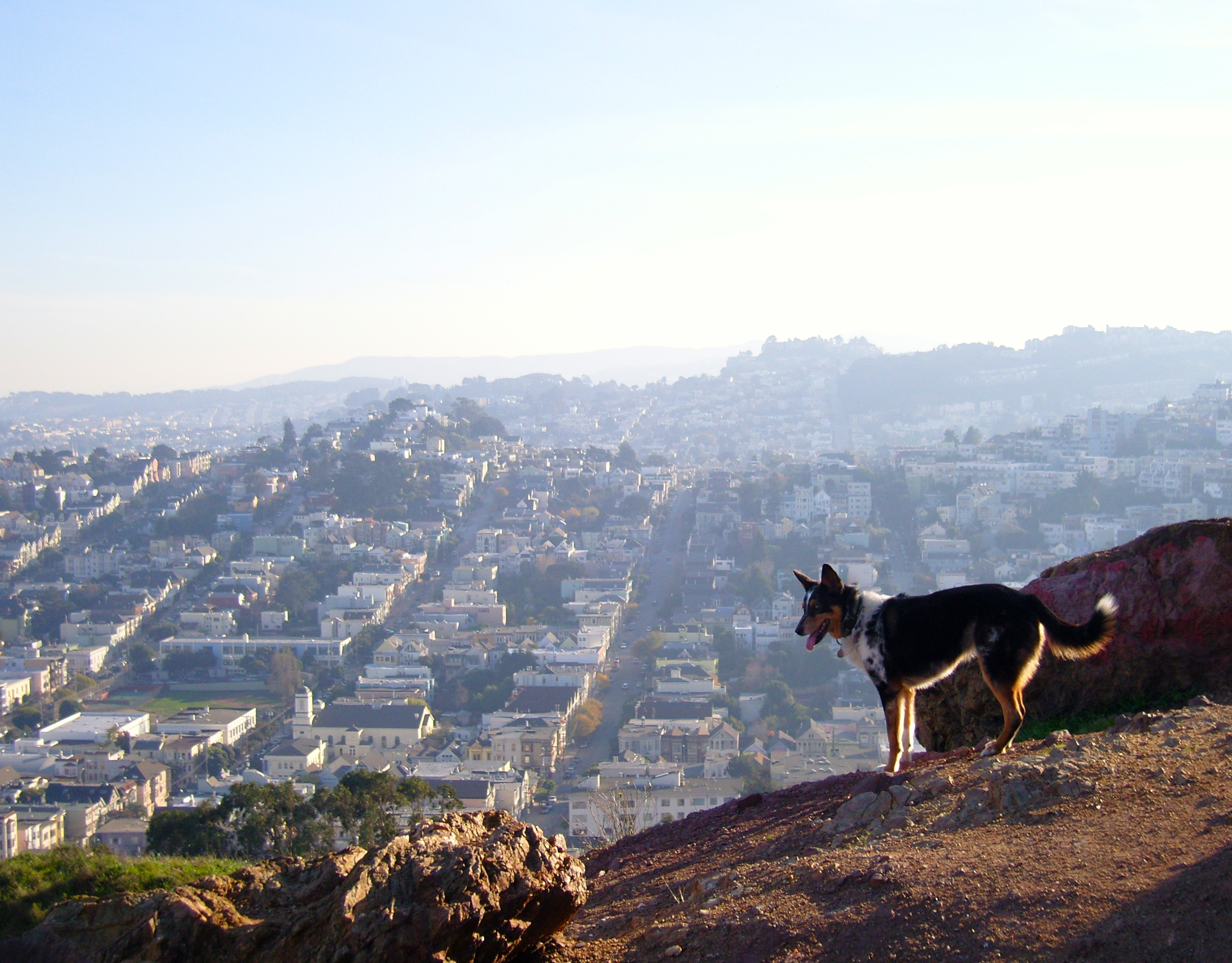
View from the hill

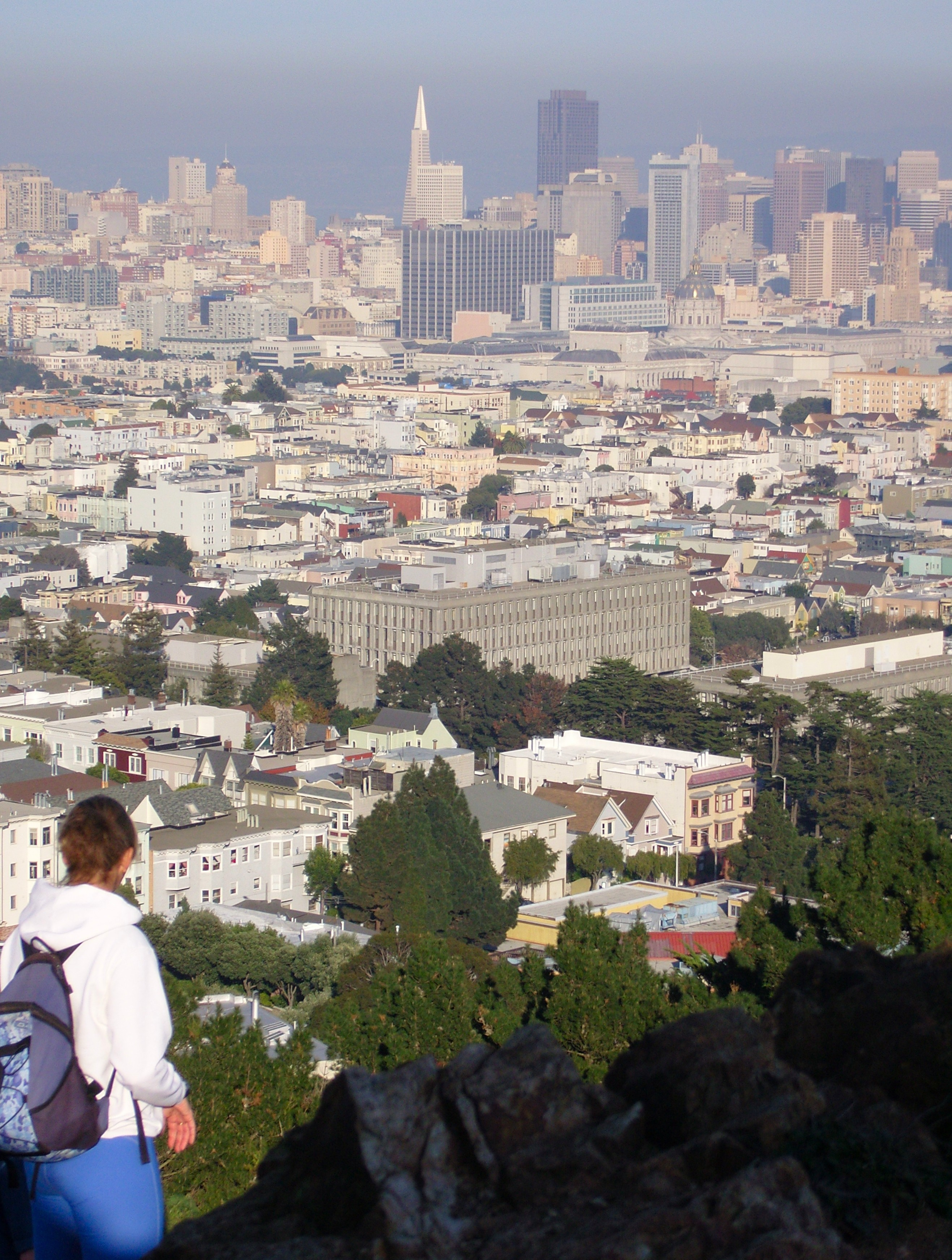
View downtown from the hill

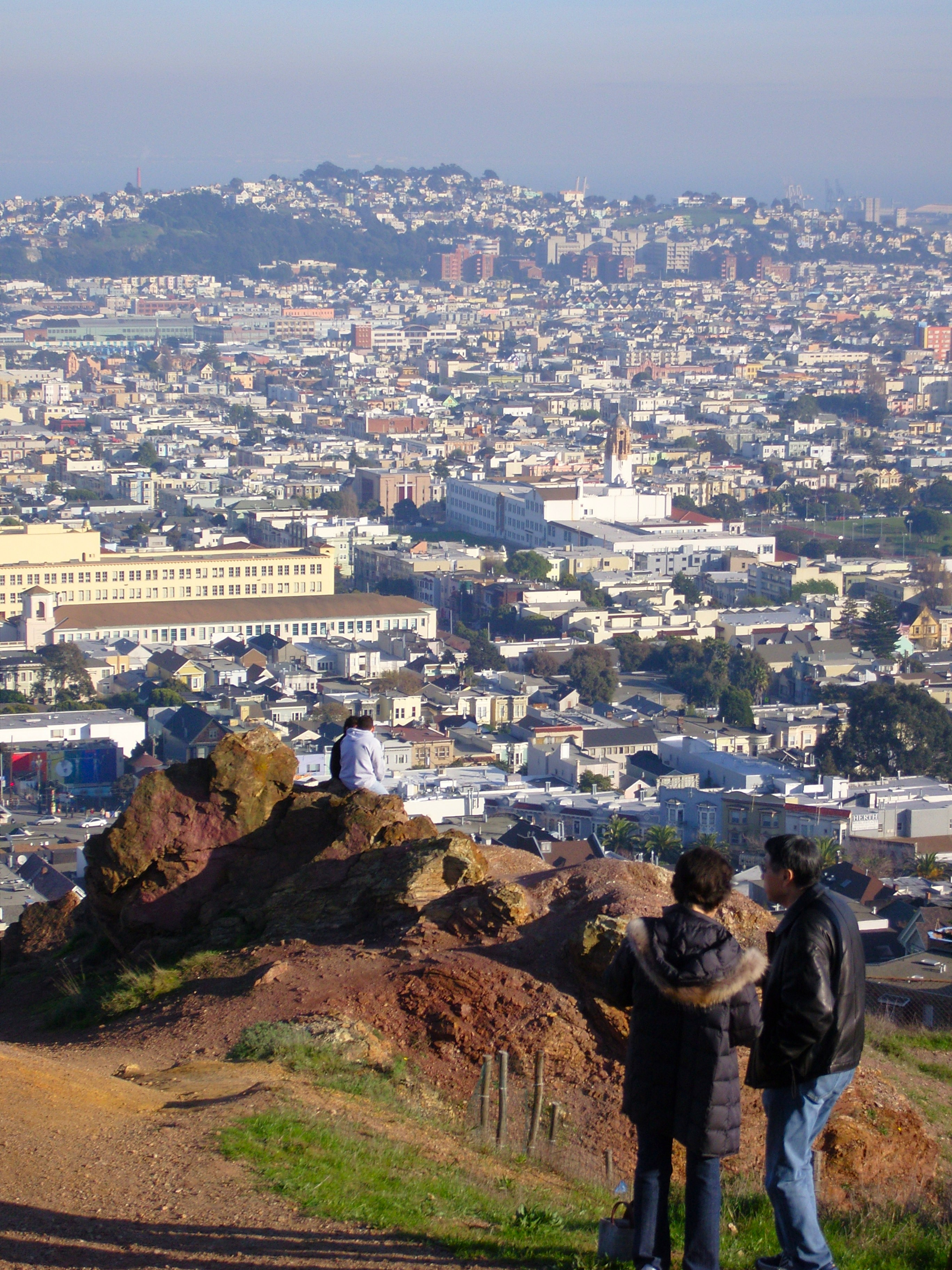
View from the hill

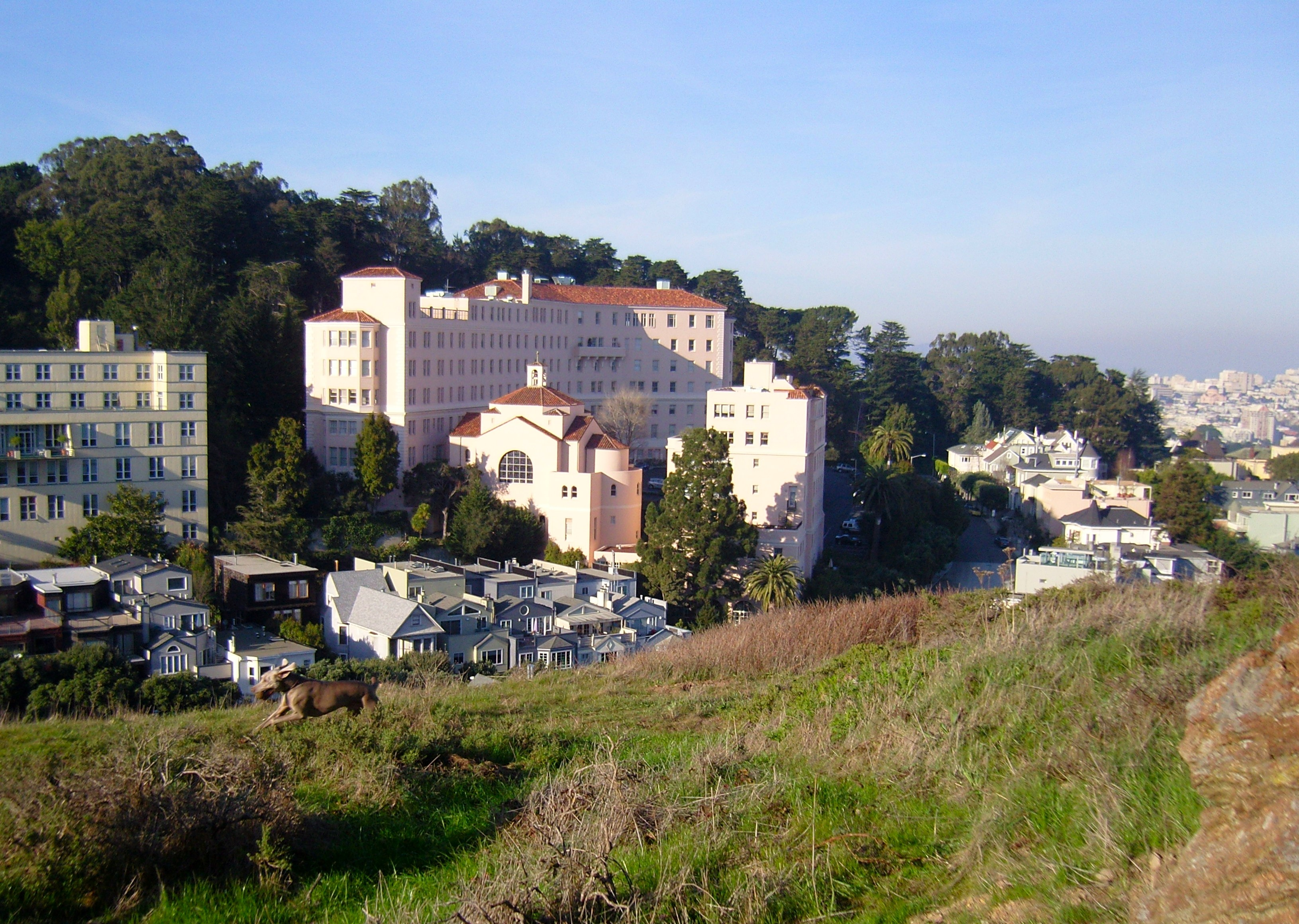
View from the hill

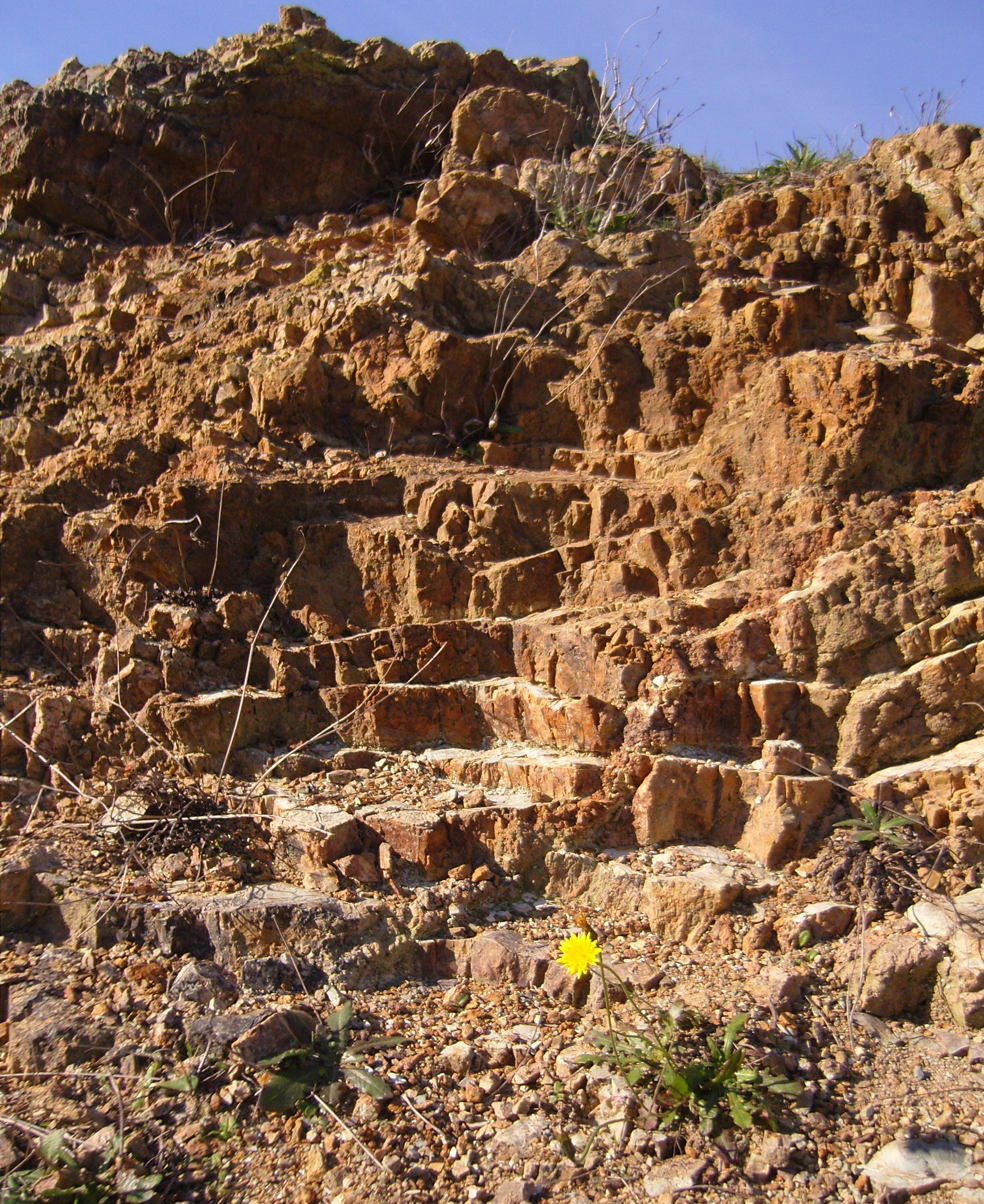
Franciscan chert dominates the barren hill

== Popular culture ==
Corona Heights is prominently featured in the 1977 horror novel "Our Lady of Darkness" by Fritz Leiber.

== See also ==
- List of hills in San Francisco
