= Josephine Dows Randall =

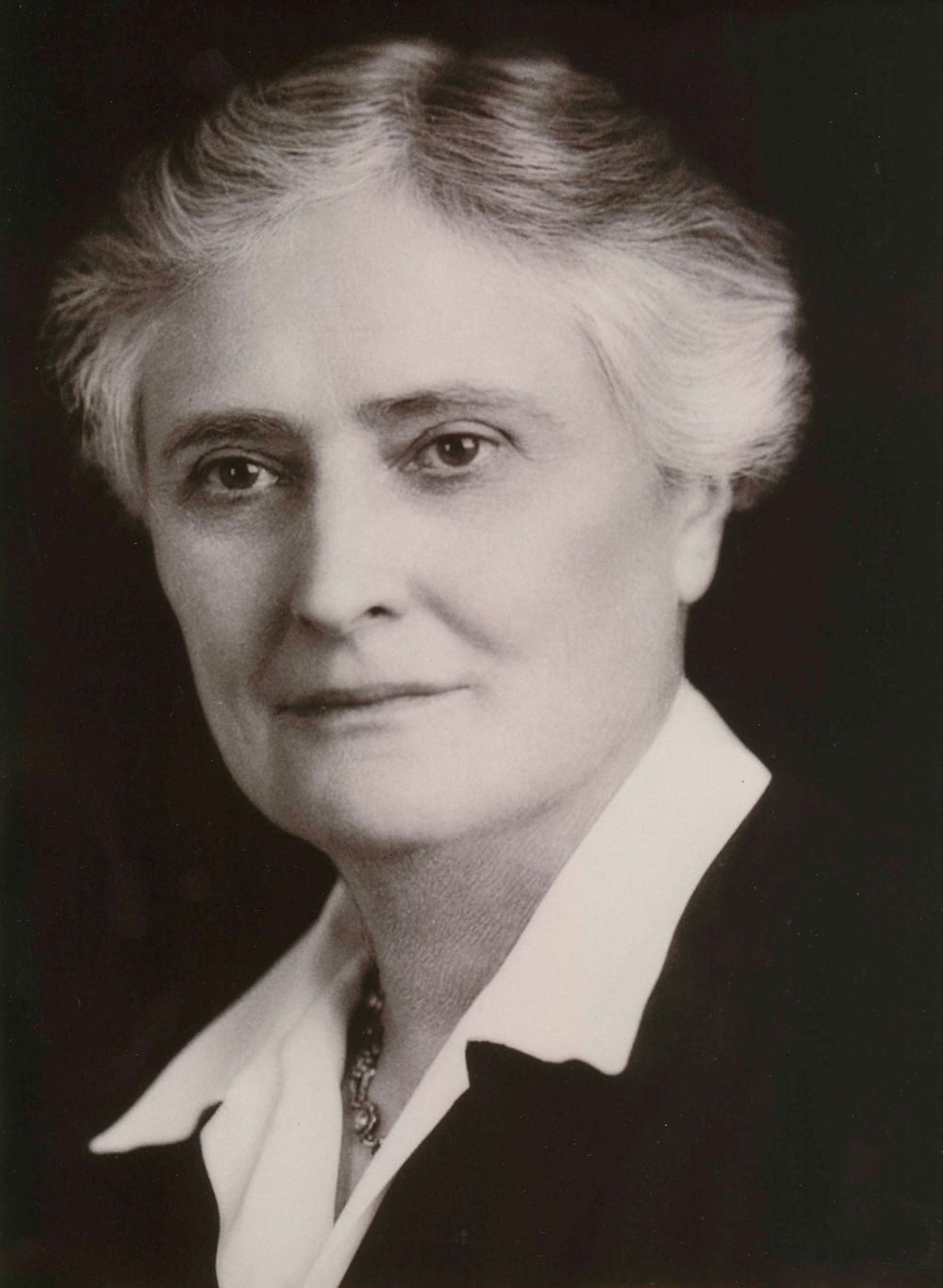
- Born: July 11, 1885; Sebastopol, California
- Died: April 3, 1968 (aged 82); Palo Alto, California
- Occupation: Superintendent of the Department of Recreation
- Known for: Pioneer in public administration of municipal recreation programs in the City and County of San Francisco (1926 - 1951)

Josephine Dows Randall (July 11, 1885 – April 3, 1968) achieved a long and distinguished career in the field of public recreation. She graduated from Stanford University in 1909 and received a master's degree graduate in zoology from there in 1913. She is credited with organizing one of the first-ever Girl Scout troops in the country in 1915, and for beginning one of the first-ever Camp Fire Girls troops. From 1926 to 1951, she served as the Superintendent of Recreation for the San Francisco Recreation & Parks Department. Her work was foundational to the development of children's recreation in the city.

In 1937 she founded the Junior Museum in San Francisco, in the city's old jail on what is now the campus of City College of San Francisco. In 1947 she spearheaded a $12 million bond for some 50 recreation projects across the city, which included buying 16 hilltop acres off Market Street, north of the Castro, for a new museum. The property is now known as Corona Heights Park. In 1951, the museum moved to the new building in the park, which was formally dedicated by Mayor Elmer Robinson as the "Josephine Dows Randall Junior Museum" in her honor, now known as the Randall Museum.

Mrs. Sigmund Stern and Josephine Randall were also the co-founders of the San Francisco Civic Symphony in 1931, which remained a part of San Francisco's Park and Recreation Department until 2002.

She received an honorary doctorate from the University of California in 1951.
