= Pulgas Water Temple =

California, USA structure

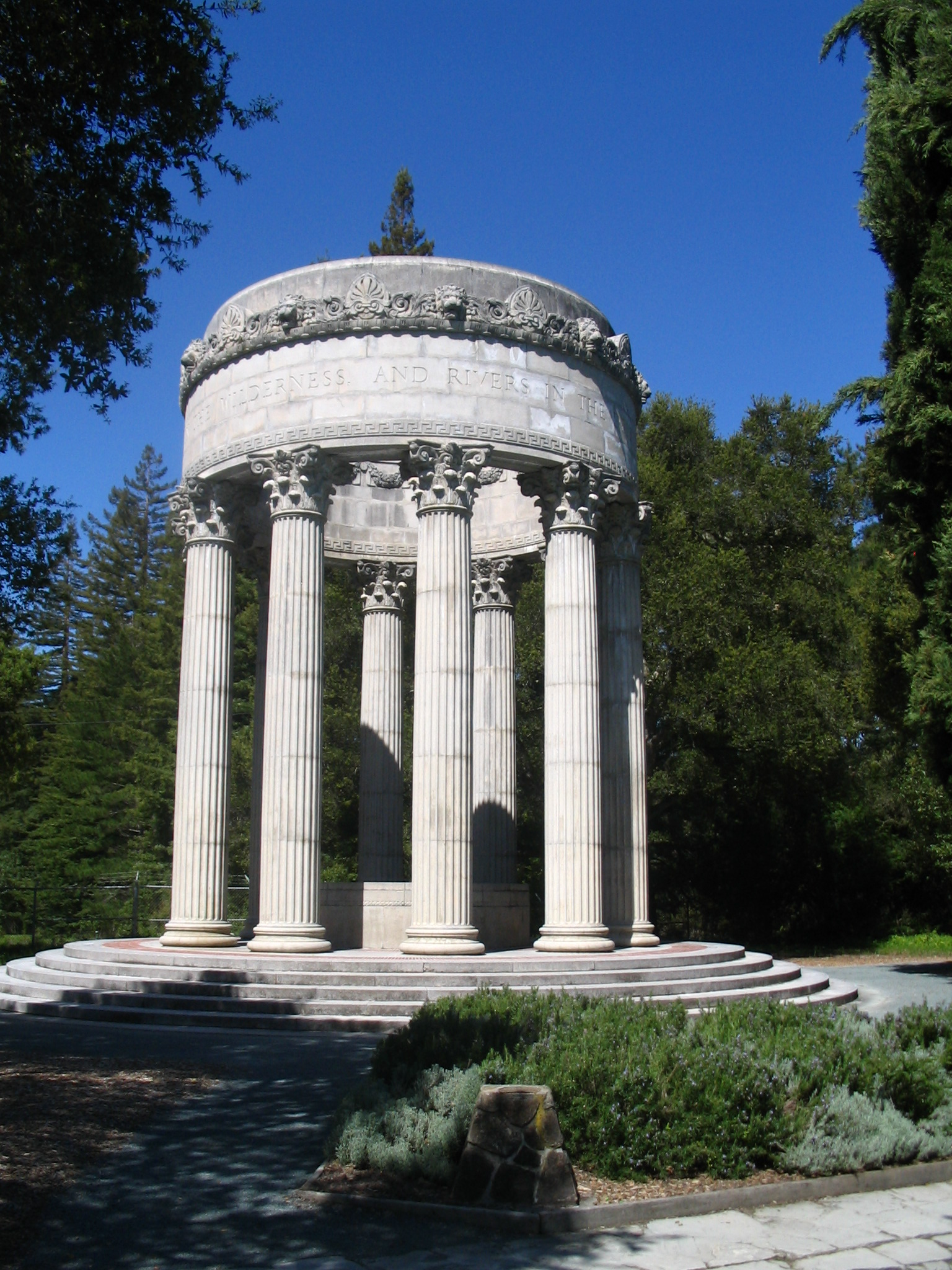
- Interactive map of the Pulgas Water Temple area

General information
- Location: 56 Cañada Road, Redwood City, California, USA
- Coordinates: 37.483322°N 122.317146°W

The Pulgas Water Temple is a stone structure in Redwood City, California, United States, designed by architect William G. Merchant. It was erected by the San Francisco Water Department to commemorate the 1934 completion of the Hetch Hetchy Aqueduct and is located at the aqueduct's terminus; originally water flowed through a vault under the temple itself, but new requirements for treatment require it to be diverted to a plant nearby. The name comes from Rancho de las Pulgas, an early Spanish land grant. Pulgas is the Spanish word for "fleas". The grant was named as such because the main village of the Lamchin, the Ohlone tribe living in the San Carlos area before the Spanish settlers arrived, was called, "Cachanigtac." The name appears to contain a word for vermin, which the Spanish missionaries translated as Las Pulgas (the Fleas).

== Temple ==
The permanent water temple was completed in 1938, replacing an original made largely of plywood. Designed by architect William Merchant and with carving by Albert Bernasconi, it consists of a circle of fluted Corinthian columns surmounted by a large masonry ring bearing the inscription "I give waters in the wilderness and rivers in the desert, to give drink to my people" [from Isaiah 43:20]. There is a reflecting pool lined with cypress trees.

San Francisco and other Bay Area communities are supplied with water from the Hetch Hetchy Reservoir approximately 160 miles (260 km) away via the Hetch Hetchy Aqueduct. Originally, the water flowed over a small C-shaped waterfall within the Pulgas Water Temple itself and then continued for approximately 800 feet (240 m) down a canal to the west into Upper Crystal Springs Reservoir.

== Diversion ==
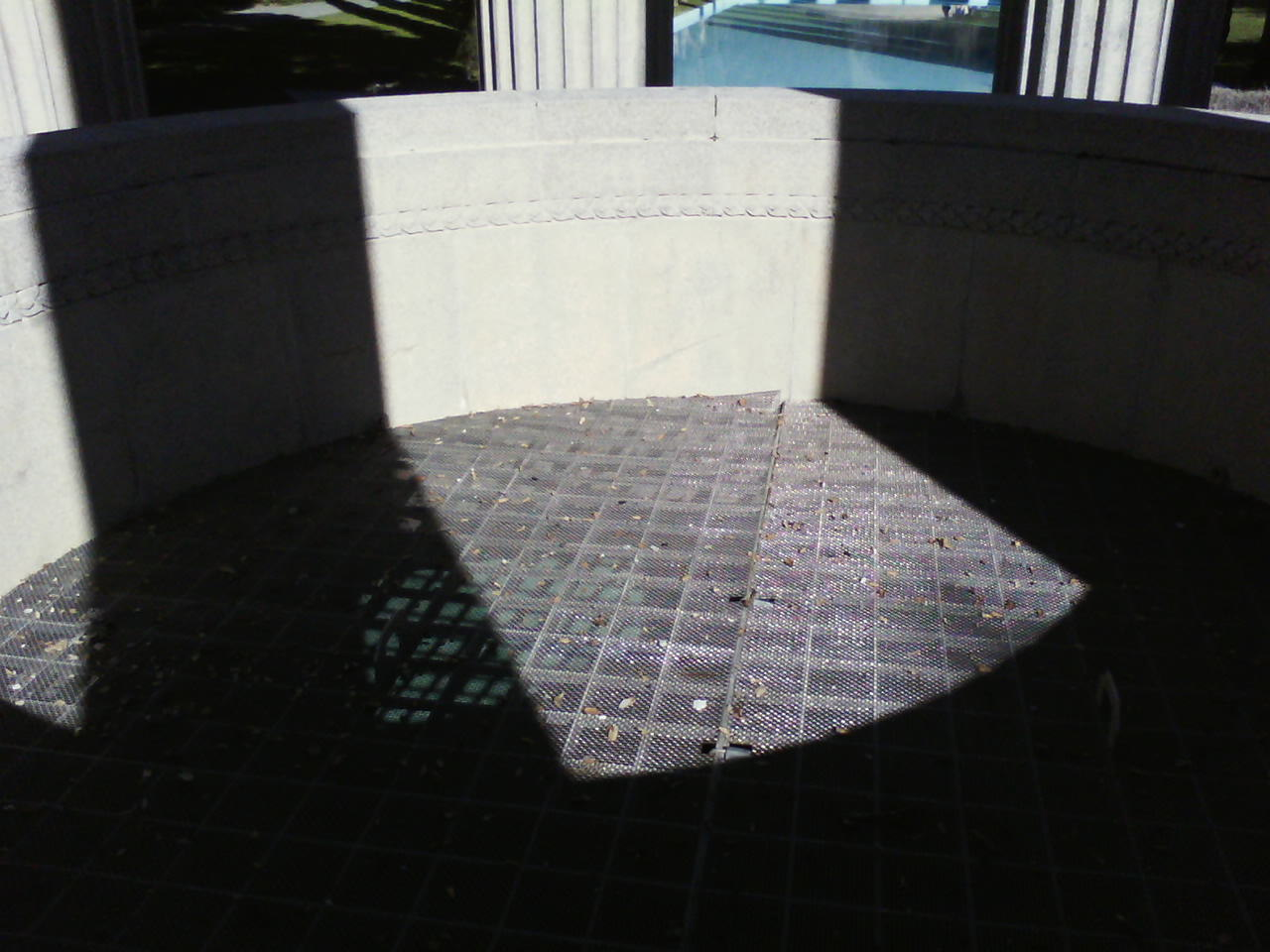
Grate was placed covering the well inside the temple

The well within the temple was covered with a grate to prevent thrill-seekers from jumping in and riding the water down the canal. Since 2004, water no longer flows through the temple, but instead is diverted to a nearby treatment plant where chloramine added at the Sunol treatment plant is removed before the water enters the reservoir, to avoid possible ecological damage from the additive. Water fed into the water supply is treated again with chloramine at a plant in San Bruno.

== Historical Landmark ==
California Historical Landmark No. 92 is located here, commemorating the camping place, somewhere in this immediate area, of the Spanish Portola expedition on November 11, 1769. Members of the expedition were the first Europeans to explore inland areas of California, and the first to see San Francisco Bay. On the previous day, while camped at San Francisquito Creek, expedition leaders made the decision to turn around and begin the return journey to San Diego. This meant first retracing their steps north to where they had crossed Sweeney Ridge from the coast.

== Filming Location ==
The site was featured in Kate Kline May's 1983 adaptation of Alice’s Adventures in Wonderland, Alice Underground, serving as the setting for the croquet scene, in which cast members played croquet in the pool.

It was also used in Oliver Stone's 1991 biographical musical film The Doors, depicting an outdoor concert by Jim Morrison. An additional stage with pillars was erected for filming.

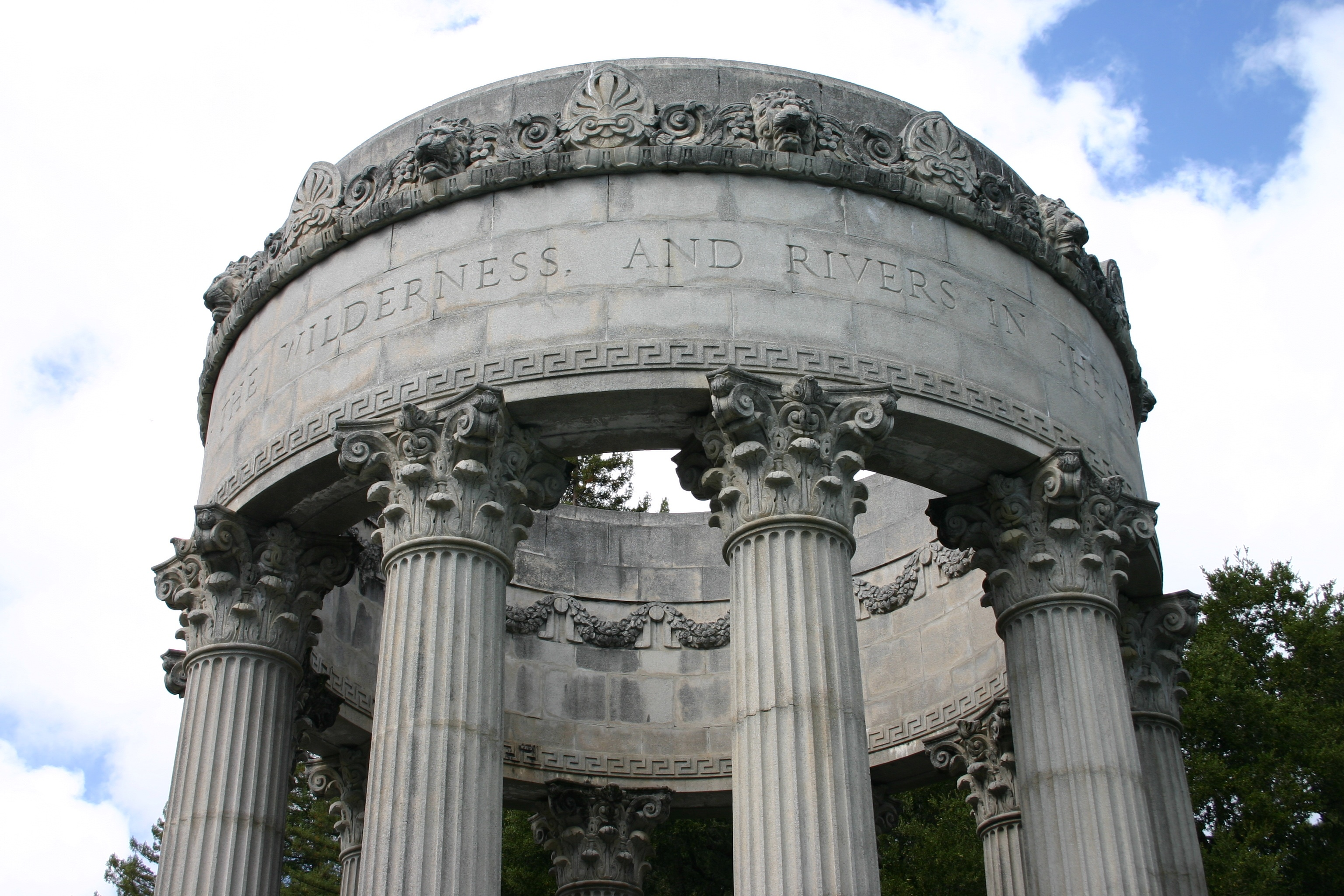
Temple detail

== See also ==
- Sunol Water Temple
- Hetch Hetchy Valley

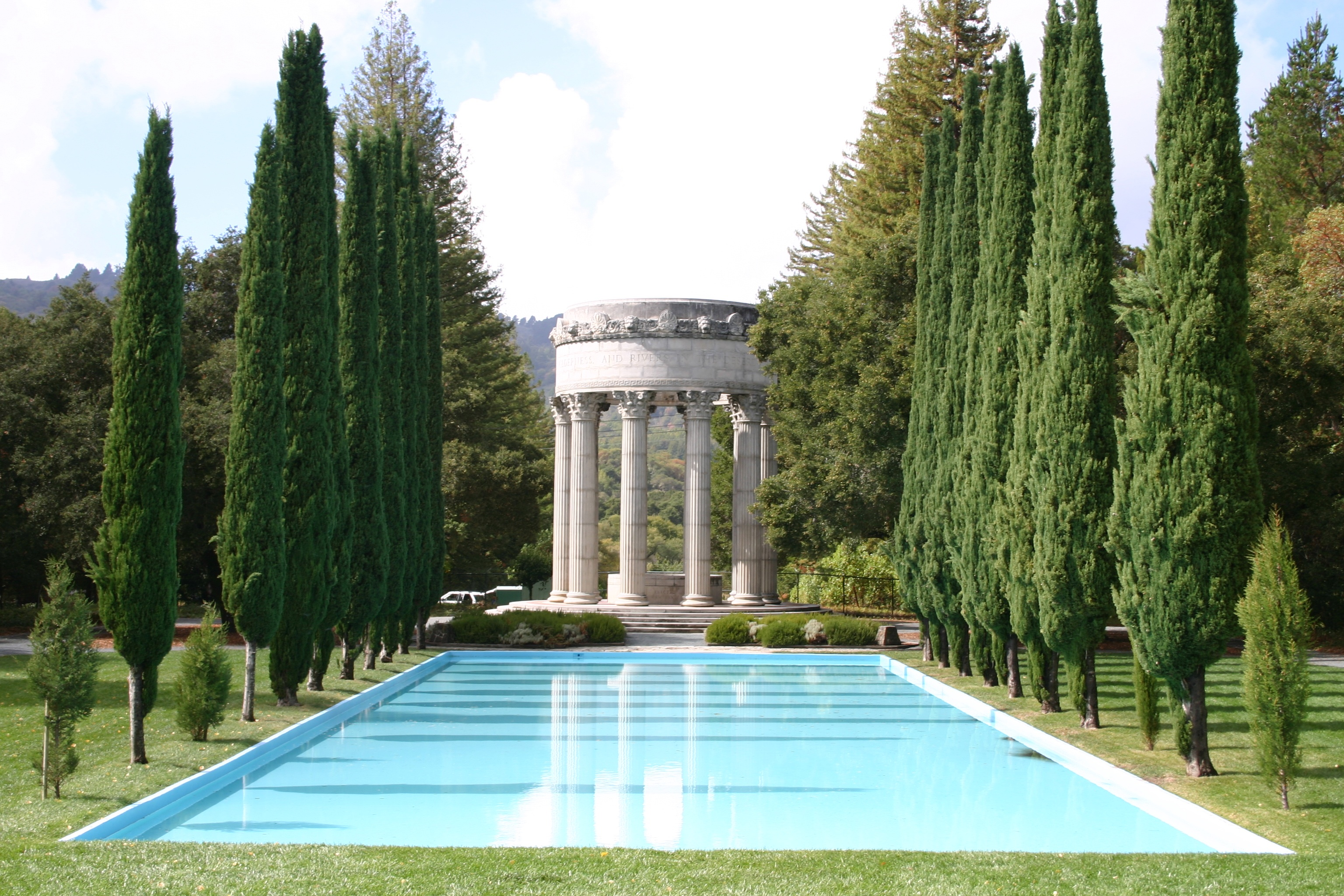
temple with reflecting pool
