= William G. Merchant =

American architect (1889–1962)

- Born: 1889; Healdsburg, California, U.S.
- Died: 1962 (aged 72–73)
- Other name: William Gladstone Merchant
- Education: Wilmerding School of Industrial Arts
- Occupation: Architect
- Practice: William G. Merchant & Associates
- Buildings: Pulgas Water Temple; Pacific House, Golden Gate International Exposition; Randall Museum
- Projects: McLaren Park master plan; Palace of Fine Arts rehabilitation plans

William Gladstone Merchant (1889-1962) was an American architect based in San Francisco. He designed exhibition pavilions, schools, medical buildings and municipal recreation facilities in the San Francisco Bay Area, as well as industrial buildings for the Pacific Gas and Electric Company.

Merchant assisted Bernard Maybeck with the original Palace of Fine Arts for the 1915 Panama–Pacific International Exposition and later campaigned for its reconstruction. His other commissions included Pulgas Water Temple, Pacific House at the 1939 Golden Gate International Exposition, and the Randall Museum. From 1949 to 1961, he was an ex officio regent of the University of California as president of the Mechanics' Institute.

== Early life and education ==
Merchant was born in Healdsberg California. He graduated from the Wilmerding School of Industrial Arts in San Francisco in 1909 and became a licensed architect in 1920.

== Early Work ==
From 1911 to 1914 Merchant worked as a junior associate of Bernard Maybeck during the period when Maybeck was designing the San Francisco Palace of Fine Art for the 1915 Panama–Pacific International Exposition, and he is credited as an assistant designer of the building.

In 1917 Merchant went to work for George W. Kelham, who later became the lead architect for the 1939 Golden Gate International Exposition, and remained there until 1928.

== Independent Career ==
W.G. Merchant & Associates was founded in 1930 and initially focused on commercial buildings. In 1932 he became the consulting architect of the San Francisco Recreation Commission and worked on many municipal project throughout the city including 28 parks and playgrounds.

Another frequent client of his was the Pacific Gas and Electric Company. Merchant designed several power stations and the Morro-Bay Power Plant for the utility.

Merchant was part of the Architectural Commission for the 1939 Golden Gate International Exposition and was the principal architect for the fair's "thematic center" the Pacific House as well as three other buildings on Treasure Island.

In 1960 Merchant was chosen to lead the restoration of the Palace of Fine Arts, but died in 1962 before it was completed.

== Civic Engagement and Personal Life ==
Merchant actively participated in the San Francisco Downtown Association and served as its president in 1943.cd

In 1949 William Merchant was selected as president of the Mechanics Institute which made him an ex officio Regent of the University of California. He held both of these concurrent positions until 1961.

From 1958 to 1960 He served on the Board of Directors of the San Francisco Opera and helped create sets for the Opera.

William Gladstone Merchant was married to Alexandra V. Merchant.
