= Billy Goat Hill, San Francisco =

Coordinates: 37.741452°N 122.433018°W

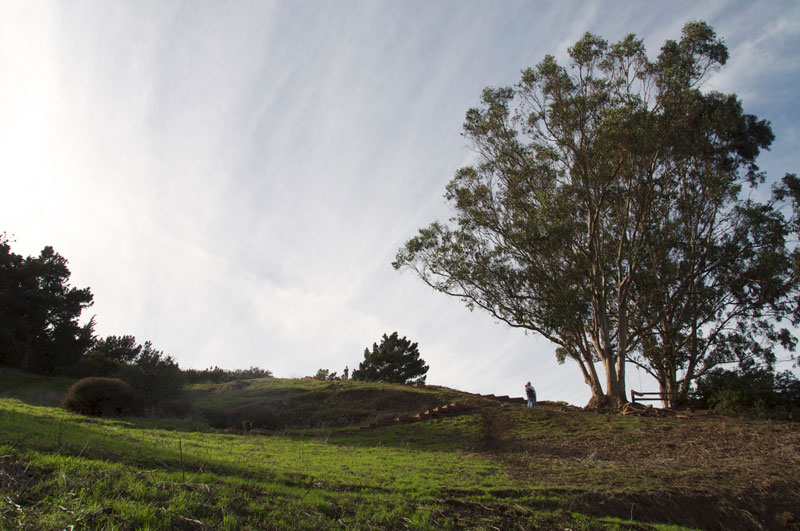
View of Billy Goat Hill

Billy Goat Hill, San Francisco is the easternmost peak in the San Miguel Range located in the Glen Park neighborhood in San Francisco, California.

== Location ==
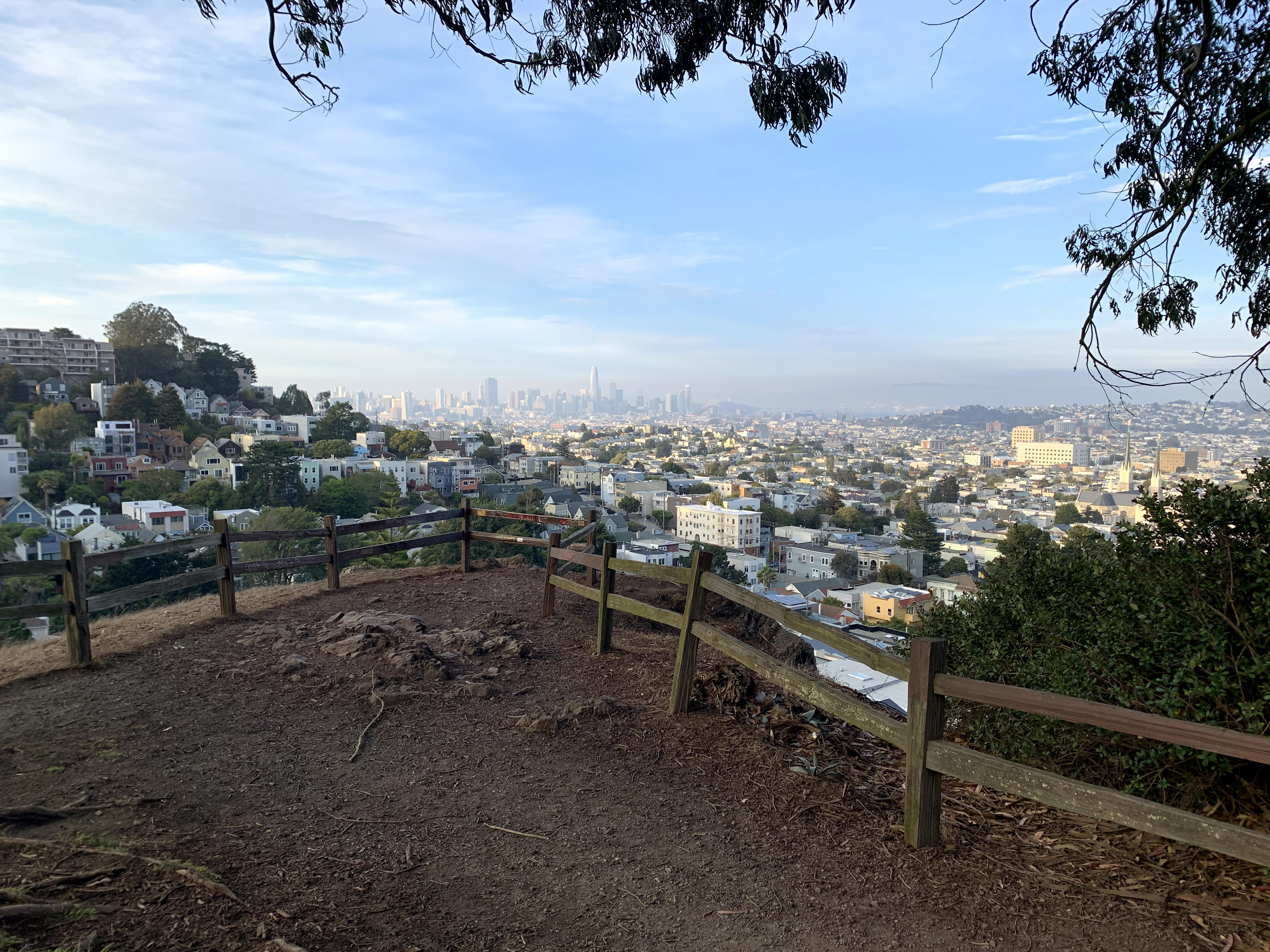
View of San Francisco from Billy Goat Hill

The Hill is located on the corner of 30th and Laidley streets, near the outskirts of Noe Valley, where wooden stairs and a steep dirt path lead to lookout point of about 500 feet, which offers excellent views of the Bay Bridge and downtown San Francisco.

== Characteristics ==
The top of the rocky hill has two large old eucalyptus trees where a wooden rope swing once stood, but after recent renovations by the San Francisco Recreation and Parks Department, the swing has been taken down. The $150,000 renovation project included the opening of Beacon Trail, a path connecting Billy Goat Hill to Walter Haas Playground, in July 2016.

Billy Goat Hill is a destination for tourists and locals to take in views of the city. There is an array of wildflowers and greenery, including California saxifrage, which can only be found in two other areas of San Francisco.

== History ==
The Hill is what remains of a quarry that was mined by the Gray Brothers in the late 1800s and early 1900s. Once the Quarry closed, the Hill became a neighborhood common space, but also a dumping ground for locals. It was not until 1975 when it officially became a city park; only a mere 3.5 acres, the park also includes a small network of trails, which has now expanded to The Walter Haas Playground.

== See also ==
- List of Hills in San Francisco
- Glen Park, San Francisco
- Corona Heights, San Francisco
- List of Parks in San Francisco
