= Randall Museum =

Museum in San Francisco, California

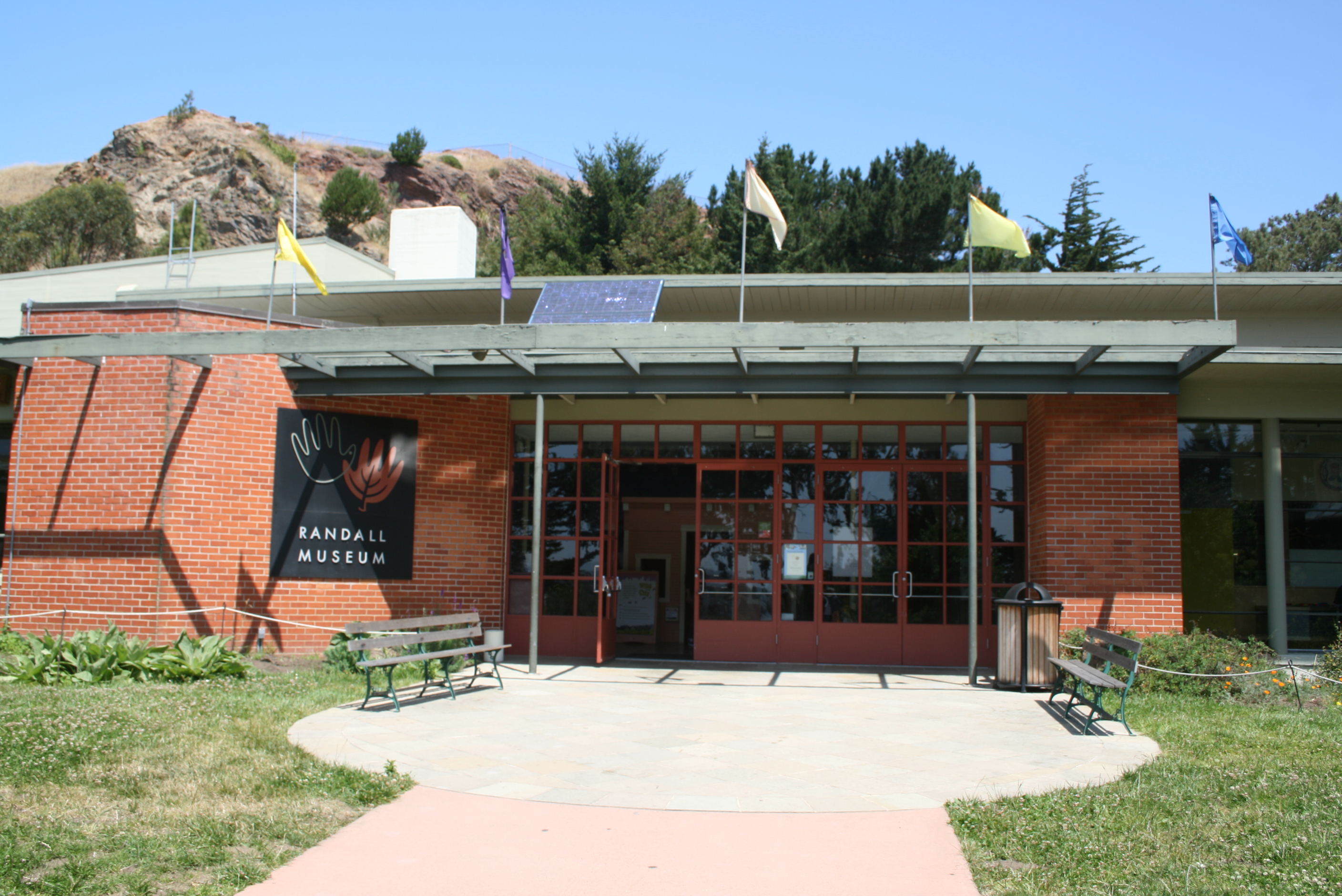
- Entrance to the Randall Museum in Corona Heights

- Location within San Francisco County Location within California Location within the United States
- Established: 1937; relocated in 1951
- Location: 199 Museum Way; San Francisco, California, US
- Coordinates: 37.764387°N 122.43813°W
- Type: Science, art, crafts, and natural history
- Visitors: 80,000 (2003)
- Director: Chris Boettcher
- Website: randallmuseum.org

The Randall Museum is a museum in central San Francisco, California, owned and operated by the San Francisco Recreation & Parks Department with the support of the Randall Friends. The museum focuses on science, nature and the arts. On exhibit are live native animals and interactive displays about nature. Other facilities include a theater, a wood shop, and art and ceramics studios.

Its permanent location is in Corona Heights Park, on a large hill between the Castro and Haight-Ashbury districts of San Francisco. The Corona Heights location features views of the city, downtown financial district and the San Francisco Bay.

== History ==
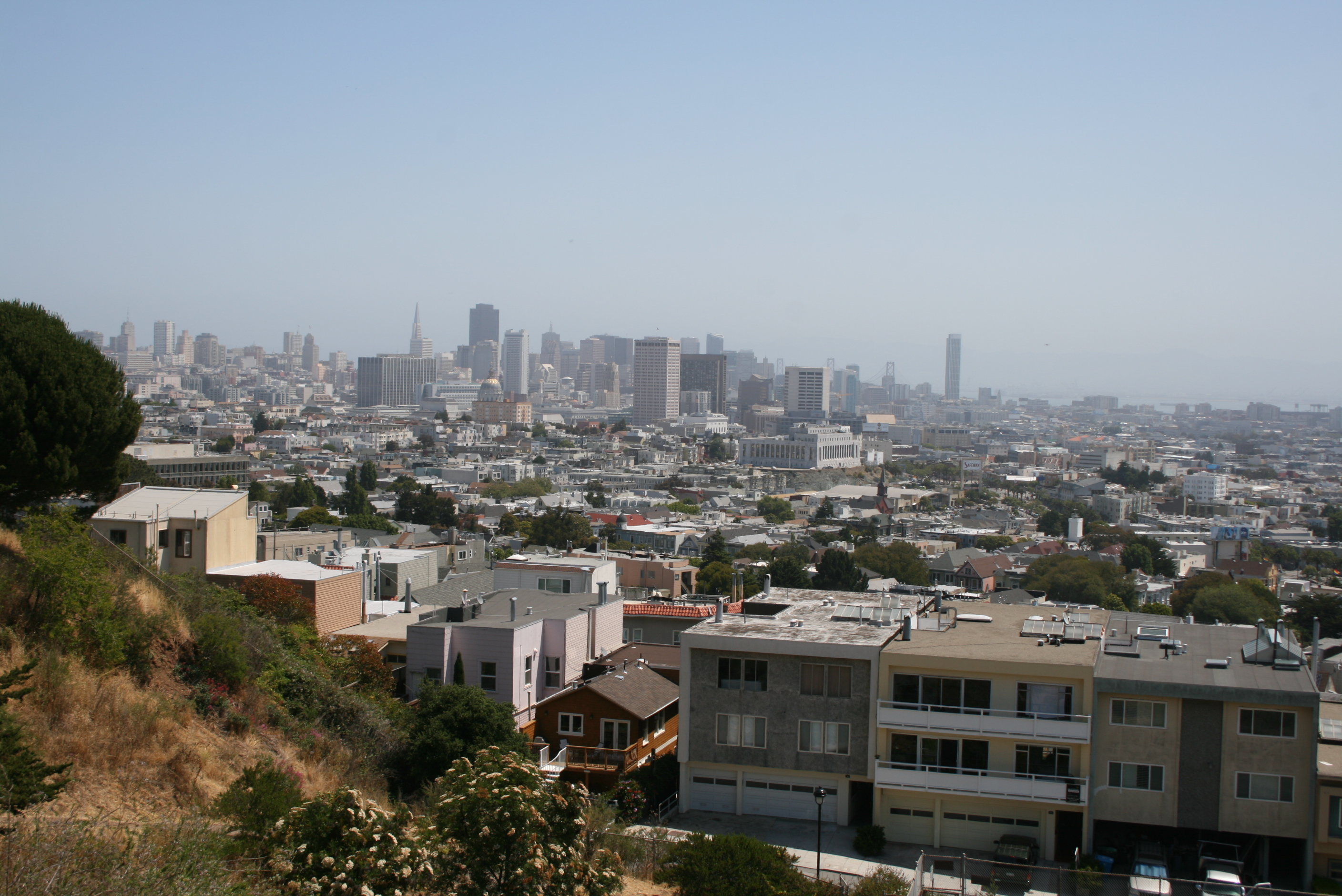
View of downtown San Francisco from the Randall Museum

Originally named the "Junior Museum", the facility was established in 1937 in an old city jail on what is now the campus of City College of San Francisco. In 1947, a $12 million bond was issued for the creation of recreation and park capital projects, one of which included a new museum. In 1951, the museum opened at its current location in a building designed by William Merchant with exhibits, a theater, classrooms, arts and crafts shops and studios, a live animal room and gardens overlooking the San Francisco Bay. The museum was formally dedicated by Mayor Elmer Robinson on September 23 of that year as the 'Josephine D. Randall Junior Museum' to honor its founder.

Josephine Randall first visited Corona Heights in 1928. Prior to its acquisition and use for the namesake museum, it had been used as a rock quarry until the 1906 San Francisco earthquake; kilns on the slope of the hill exploded and collapsed in the wake of the earthquake, and the quarries were subsequently abandoned.

=== Renovations ===
In 2003, the museum dedicated its Outdoor Learning Environment, which replaced a parking lot and driveway. The museum's director, Amy Dawson, characterized the prior structures as "an asphalt moat". Sculptures by Beniamino Bufano were temporarily moved to the Randall Museum from 2004 to 2006 while their permanent home, the Valencia Gardens housing project in The Mission, was demolished and rebuilt.

Plans were announced in 2013 for a $6 million makeover to double the space available for exhibits and programs, designed by Liz Ranieri of Kuth Ranieri Architects in a joint venture with Pfau Long Architecture. The Corona Heights location closed on June 1, 2015, to implement the planned renovations. During renovations, the museum relocated its live animal exhibit and programs to 745 Treat Ave, between 20th and 21st Street, at the Mission Art Center.

The museum held a grand reopening for the remodeled space on February 11, 2018. Mister G was scheduled to provide live music at the reopening.

== Name ==
The Randall Museum takes its name from Josephine Dows Randall, a Stanford University master's degree graduate in zoology in 1913. After graduating she traveled to the Midwest and organized one of the first Girl Scout troops in the United States as well as one of the first Camp Fire Girls troops. When she returned to California she became the first Superintendent of Recreation for San Francisco's Recreation Department, creating the Junior Museum and bringing national recognition to the San Francisco Recreation & Parks Department for its outstanding services between the years 1926 and 1952. During her tenure as the San Francisco Recreation Department Superintendent she secured hundreds of acres of open space for playgrounds and consequently, sports and artistic programming for the children and families of San Francisco.

== Overview and features ==
The museum charges no admission and offers events, workshops, plays, lectures, exhibits, and classes for ages 3–adult, but is geared mostly toward children and educational field trips. Child and adult classes are available in the wood shop, technology lab, art room and pottery studio. The museum has special topic days, such as Bug Day, Middle School Science Fair, Family Halloween Day and Winter Crafts Day, during which interested clubs and sponsors participate.

The museum's theater is home to the performances of the Young People's Teen Musical Theatre Company, a Recreation and Parks Department program closely tied to the museum.

The Golden Gate Model Rail Road Club (GGMRC) has been a tenant in the west basement wing since 1961. Children run HO-scale trains around the layout on "Junior Engineer Day," held on the third Saturday of every odd month. Prior to the 2015–18 renovation, the total track length exceeded 600 feet (180 m).

Charles Sowers was commissioned by the San Francisco Arts Commission (SFAC) to create "Windswept", a kinetic sculpture installed on the facade of the Randall Museum in 2012. The piece took four years to create and test. During the 2015–18 renovation, artist Ben Trautman was commissioned by SFAC to create a mobile of a stylized bird entitled "Wingspan", which was installed in the lobby.

== See also ==
- San Francisco
