= Calle 24 Latino Cultural District =

Latino Cultural District in San Francisco

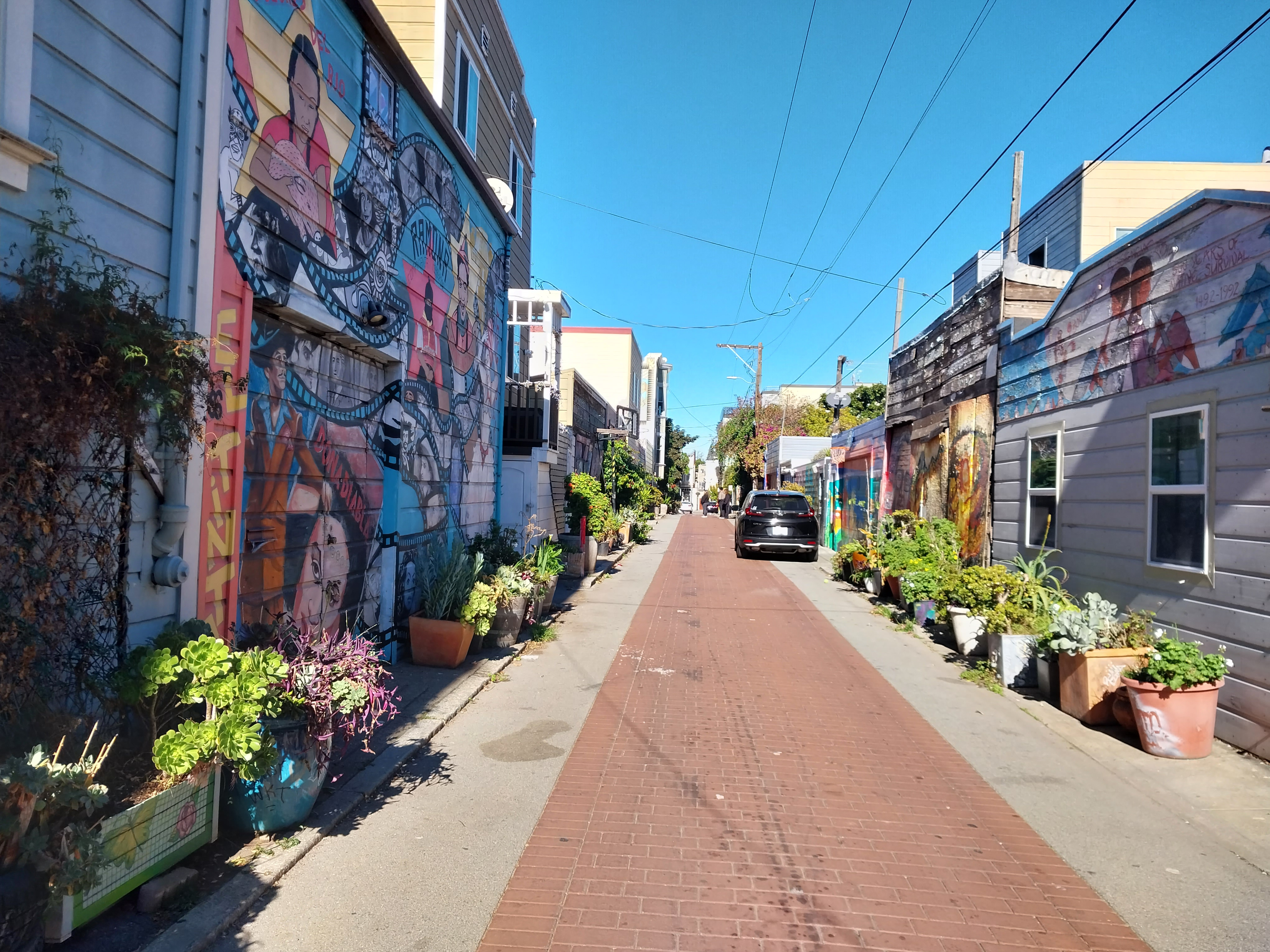
Balmy Alley murals are a featured attraction of Calle 24.

Calle 24 (“Veinticuatro”) Latino Cultural District, is a neighborhood and designated cultural district formally recognized by a resolution from the San Francisco Board of Supervisors, co-sponsored by then Mayor Edwin Lee and Supervisor David Campos, in May 2014. Often referred to as “The Heart of the Mission,” Calle 24 Latino Cultural District was established in recognition of its long history as the center of Latino activism, arts, commerce, and culture in San Francisco. Calle 24 Latino Cultural District is also the first of two recognized California Cultural Districts of its kind in San Francisco, preserving the cultural heritage of the area against the forces of gentrification, by the State of California.

The organizing body of the Lower 24th Street Merchants and Neighborhood Association created the concept of a cultural district to help preserve local Latino cultural assets in 2014. In 2018, San Francisco formally established the Cultural District Program through Proposition E. The Calle 24 Latino Cultural District is now one of eleven cultural districts located across San Francisco, each embodying a unique cultural heritage. Calle 24 is the central organizing body of the Calle 24 Latino Cultural District. It sponsors community events, provides training and support services for local business owners and residents, and hosts cultural festivals throughout the year. A central goal of their work is to prevent displacement of long-term residents and small businesses while preserving and affirming the cultural heritage of the neighborhood. In partnership with cultural organizations from within the district, Calle 24 hosts several community and arts festivals including Carnaval, Día de los Muertos, and Fiesta de las Américas.

The district boasts the most murals in the city and over 200 small businesses. Many businesses in the district have been included in the Legacy Business Registry, established in 2015 to identify and protect businesses with significant impact on the history or culture of the neighborhood. These businesses and organizations include Acción Latina, Galería de la Raza, Precita Eyes, and St. Francis Fountain.

== Location ==
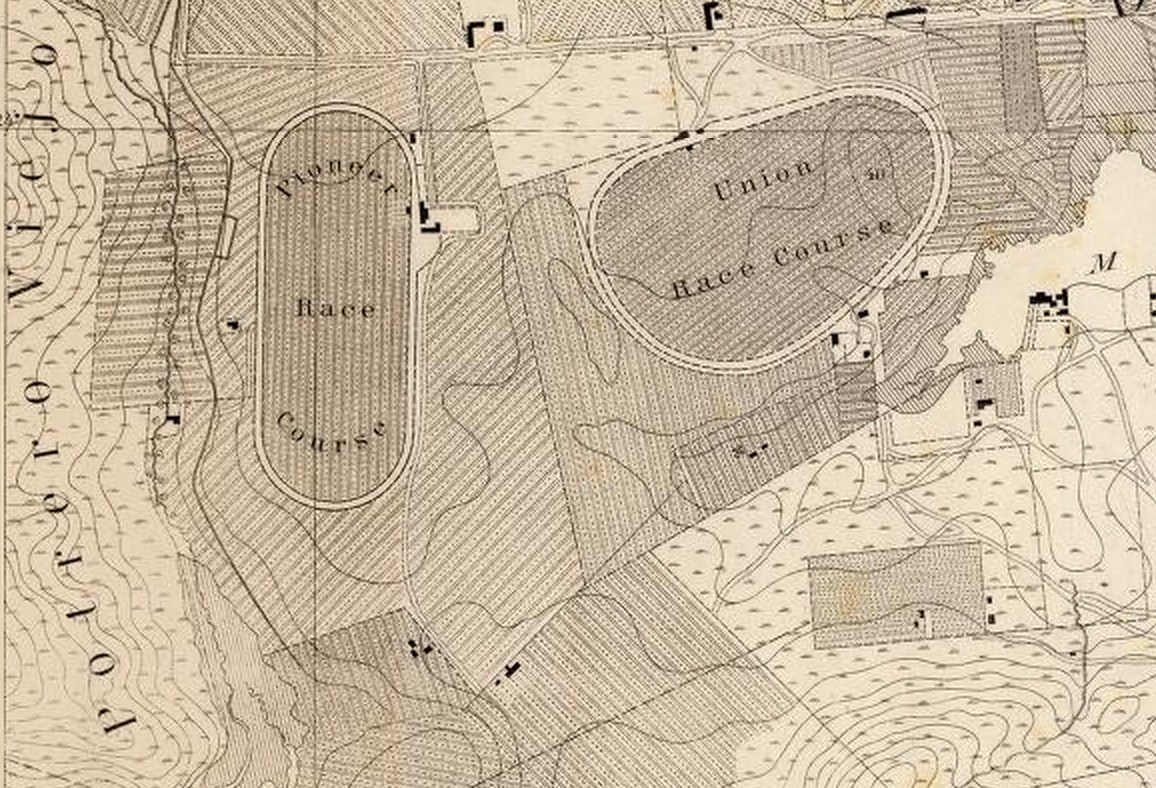
1857 Map of San Francisco's Mission District, in which Calle 24 is currently located.

The Calle 24 Cultural District spans 55 square blocks and is centered at the Calle 24 commercial corridor on 24th Street. The district boundaries are Mission Street to the West, Potrero Street to the East, 22nd Street to the North, and Cesar Chavez Street to the South.

== History ==
San Francisco’s Mission District became a Latino neighborhood post World War II, when Latinos drawn to the breweries, canneries, and textile factories in the area filled vacancies left by the Irish population as they moved into the Western neighborhoods of the city. Central American immigrants also came to the district after experiencing political upheavals throughout the 1970s and 1980s.

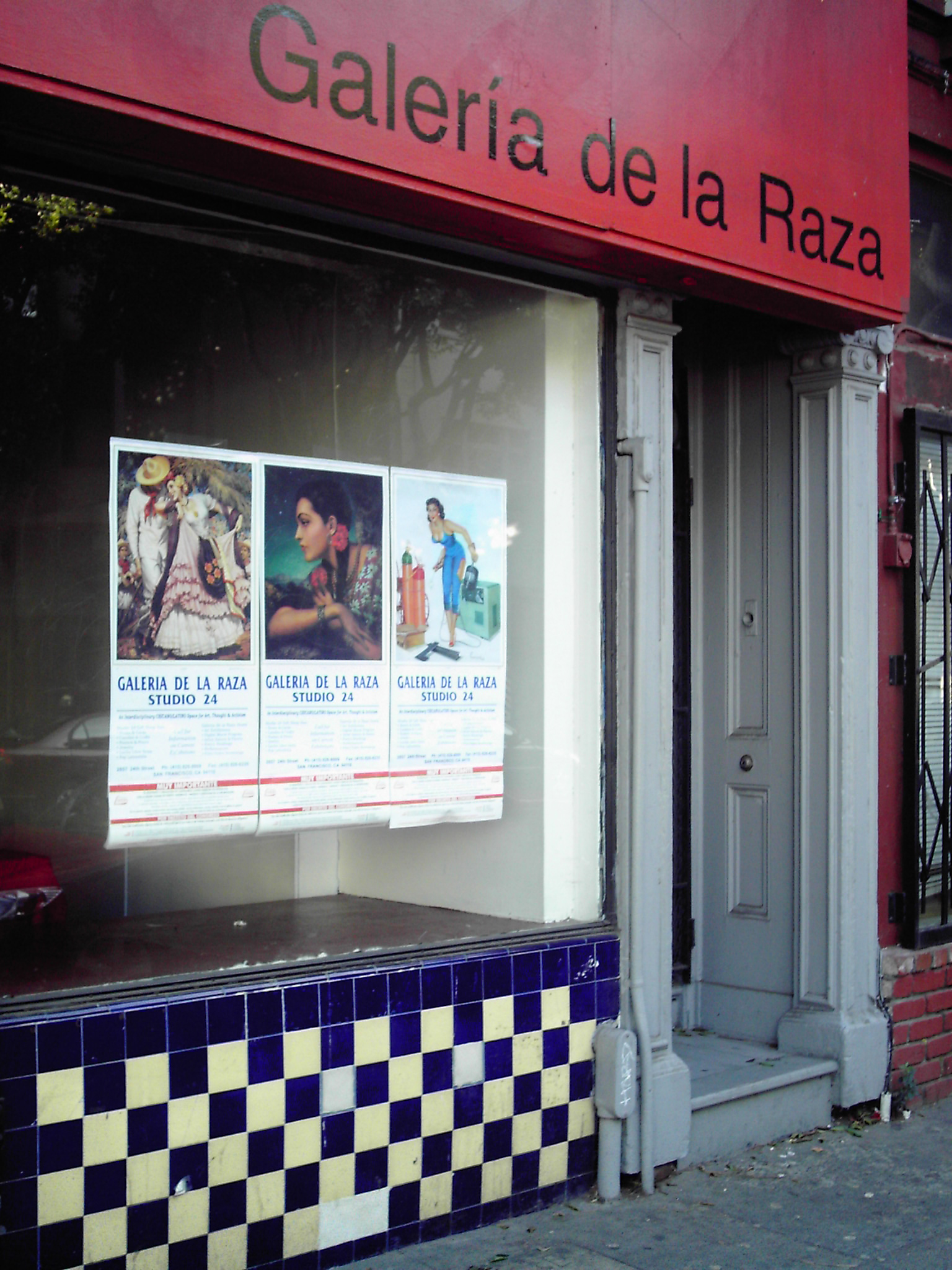
Galería de la Raza, one of the landmark businesses in Calle 24.

Galería de la Raza, a legacy organization within the Calle 24 Latino Cultural District, was a key gathering and organizing hub for Central American Solidarity Movements of the 1970 and 1980s. Pro-Sandinista protesters, gathered at the 24th Street and Mission Bart station area in the 1980s, would refer to the area as “Plaza Sandino.” Potrero del Sol Park is also known as “La Raza park” from its time in the 1970’s as a major gathering spot for lowriders. The area that would later become the Calle 24 Latino Cultural District also welcomed Latinos displaced by gentrification from neighboring districts, Noe Valley, Castro, and northern Mission areas throughout the 1970’s. The area is seen as the birthplace of Latin Rock and former home of Carlos Santana.

The Lower 24th Street Merchants and Neighbors Association was created in 1999 by a group of residents, merchants, community organizers, service providers and art organizations “to preserve, enhance and advocate for Latino cultural continuity, vitality, and community in San Francisco’s touchstone Latino Cultural District and the greater Mission neighborhood.” In response to gentrification and displacement, neighborhood advocates declared that, “It is a community priority that we exist as a living cultural district, not just a colorful tourist destination.” This group would eventually change their name to Calle 24 and serve as the central organizing body for establishing the Calle 24 Latino District.

== Attractions and characteristics ==
Calle 24 Latino Cultural District has the largest collection of murals in the city and is the home to more than 200 small businesses. The area has the highest number of Latinx-owned small businesses in San Francisco. The district is also home to over 100 independent sidewalk vendors. A distinctive element of the neighborhood are the many lowriders, whose history in the district goes back to the 70’s and can still be seen throughout the area and at community events.

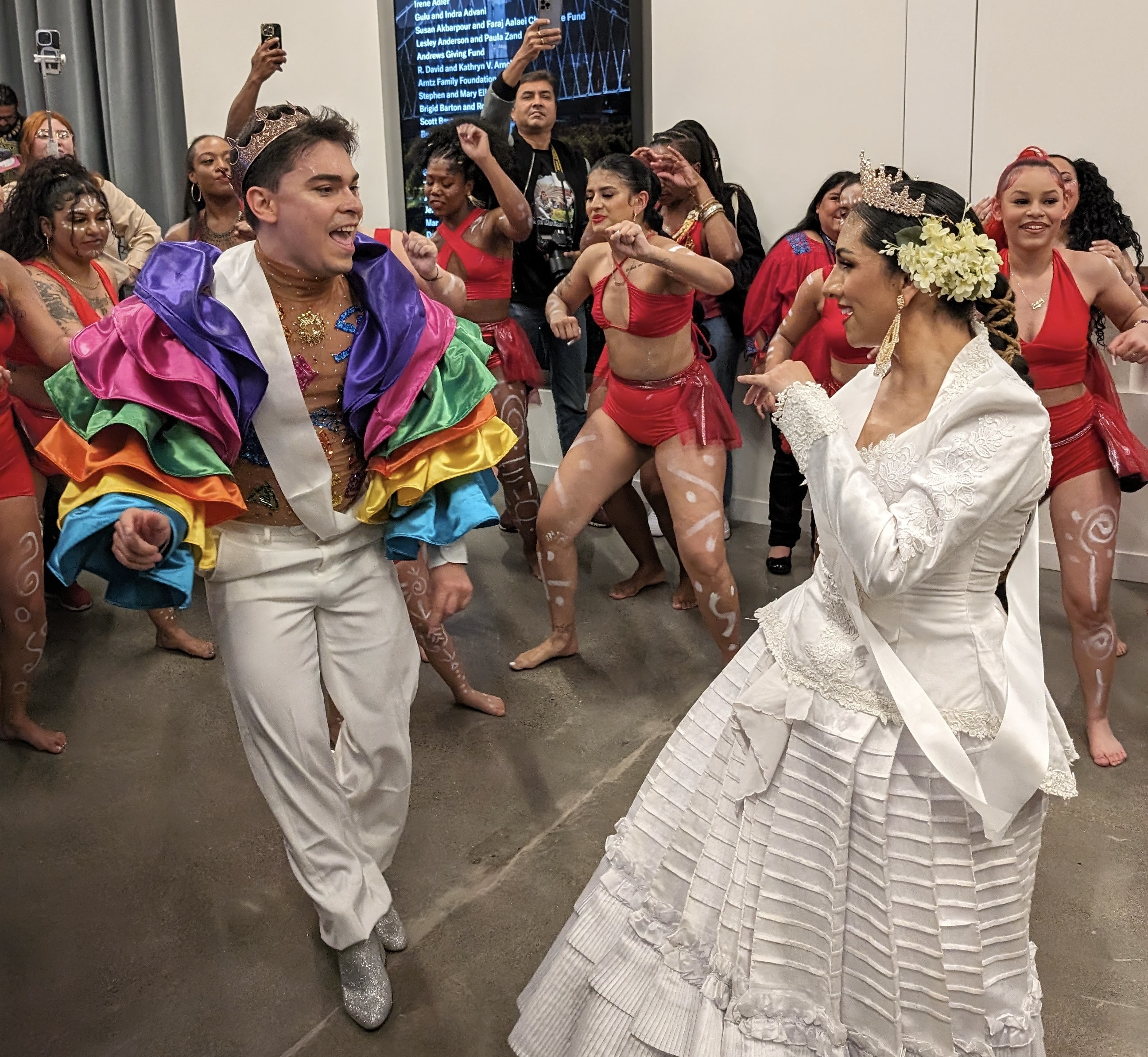
Dancing at Carnaval in San Francisco.

=== Festivals Hosted in the Calle 24 Latino Cultural District Include ===
- Cesar Chavez Parade and Festival - held every April in celebration of Cesar Chavez’s birthday.
- Baile en la Calle: Las Danzas Murale - held in the first weekend of May and featuring dynamic dance interpretations of the murals in neighborhood.
- Carnaval San Francisco - a two-day festival held in May celebrating Latin and Caribbean culture.
- Flor Y Canto Literary Festival - a three-day literary and cultural festival held in June in celebration of the city’s first Latino poet Laureate, Alejandro Marguia.
- Fiesta de las Américas - held every September to celebrate culture, arts, and music from the Latino diaspora. Produced by Calle 24 Latino Cultural District.
- Día de Los Muertos - held every November 2.
- Paseo Artístico - a bi-monthly community art stroll with free arts programming.
- Lover's Lane - held every Valentine's Day weekend.

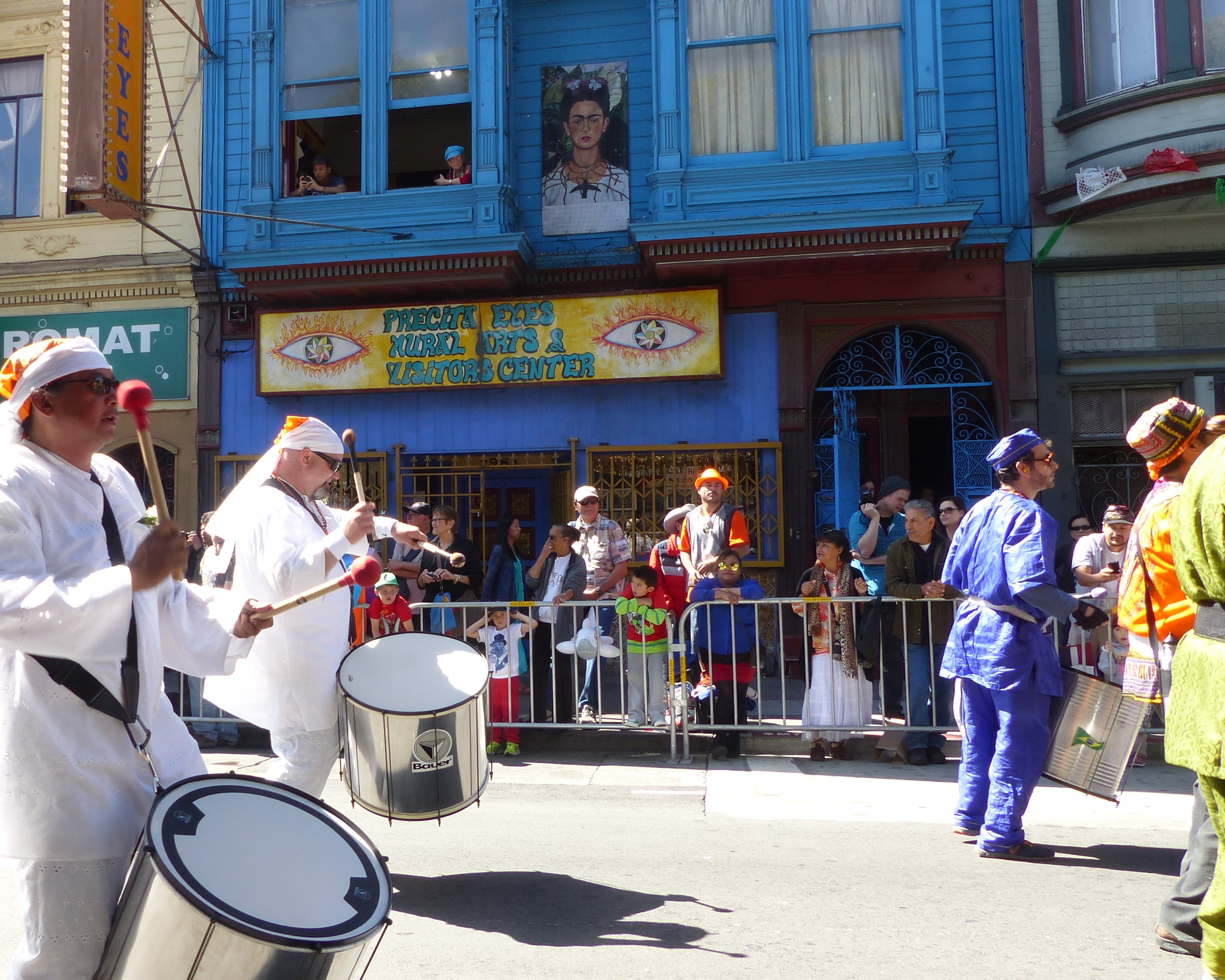
Precita Eyes, a notable cultural attraction in Calle 24 and the first legacy business in San Francisco.

=== Notable cultural arts locations ===
- 24th Street Mini Park
- Acción Latina’s Juan R. Fuentes Art Gallery
- Balmy Alley
- Precita Eyes Mural Arts and Visitors Center
- St. Peter’s Catholic Church
- Brava Theater
- Galaria de la Raza
- Mission Cultural Center for Latino Arts
- Gray Area
- The House of Latin Rock.

=== Community programs ===
Calle 24 programs are focused on four main areas: 1. Land Use, 2. Economic Vitality, 3. Arts & Culture, 4. Community Health & Wellness.

Calle 24 also hosts Calle Limpia, Corazón Contento, or Clean Street, Happy Heart, a program to respond to the needs of residents, vendors, and unhoused neighbors facing economic hardship. Along with street cleaning and trash pick-up activities, the event provides opportunities to engage with neighbors and local community organizations, training on permits for local vendors, and cultural opportunities that include free local food and traditional native performances. Calle 24 distributes free health resources in both English and Spanish, including COVID tests, condoms, sexual health information, and training on how to administer Narcan.

== Governance ==
Calle 24, the central organizing body of the Calle 24 Latino Cultural District, sponsors community events, provides training and support for local business owners and residents, and hosts cultural festivals throughout the year. The group also addresses local food security gaps by providing residents vouchers for nearby grocery stores.

== Legacy Business Program ==
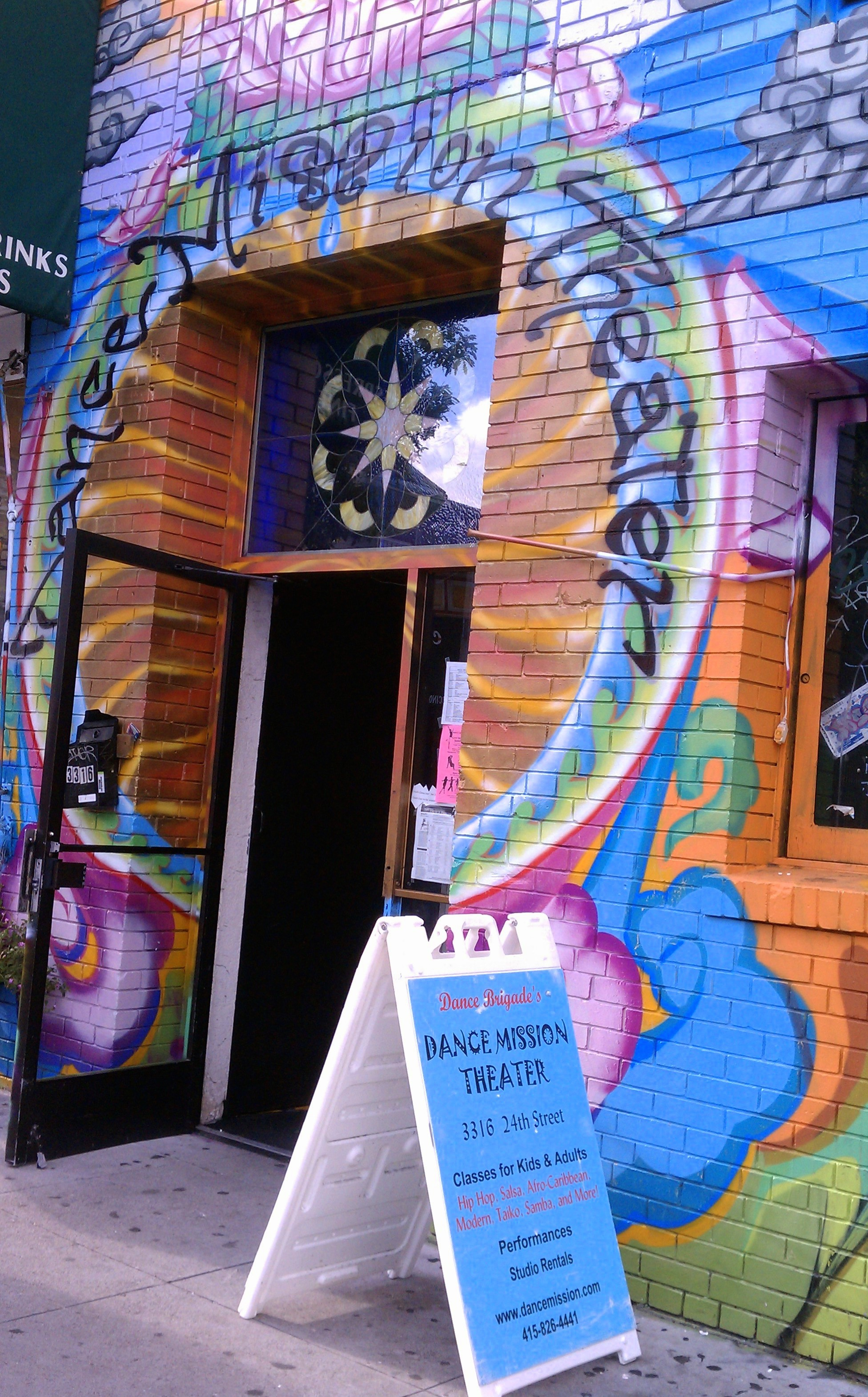
Dance Mission Theater is recognized as a legacy business in Calle 24.

To prevent displacement of legacy small businesses and organizations in San Francisco, the Legacy Business Registry and Legacy Business Historic Preservation Fund were established to identify and protect businesses with significant impact on the history or culture of the neighborhood in 2013. This was the first program of its kind that recognized small businesses as historical spaces for preservation and protection in the US. Precita Eyes, a community-based mural arts organization located in Calle 24 Latino Cultural District, was the first organization added to this registry in 2015. Additional businesses within the district have gone on to be added to the registry in subsequent years, including Accíon Latina, Adobe Books, La Mejor Bakery, Cafe la Boheme, Dance Mission Theater, Dianda's Italian American Pastry Company, Galería de la Raza, Instituto Familiar de la Raza, Pop’s Bar, and St. Francis Fountain.

== Special Use District ==
In 2017, the Board of Supervisors signed an ordinance that established the Calle 24 Special Use District. As an additional measure of protection for existing and legacy businesses in the area, a conditional use approval became required of any business seeking to replace a legacy business or to merge multiple storefronts to extend past 799 square feet. The ordinance also prevented new restaurants or bars from opening if more than 35 percent of the businesses in the surrounding 300-foot radius of the proposed business were of the same kind of establishment.

== Issues ==
Within the planning and research period for establishing the Calle 24 Latino Cultural District, the number one area of concern identified by the local community was the rapid displacement of local residents and small businesses as the result of rising rents and gentrification. Preventing displacement along with preserving and celebrating the cultural heritage of the neighborhood became central to Calle 24’s efforts.

Along with other city-supported organizations, budget cuts have impacted Calle 24. In 2023, the group’s annual budget was $1.7 million. Facing an $800 million budget deficit in the city’s budget, Calle 24’s funding was slashed to $430,000 for the 2024 fiscal year.
