= El Tecolote =

El Tecolote (from the Nahuatl tecolotl, "owl") may refer to:

- El Tecolote, Baja California Sur, Mexico
- El Tecolote, Guanajuato, Mexico
- El Tecolote (newspaper), US
- El Tecolote (restaurant), Mexican restaurant in California, US
