= Gabriela Alemán (illustrator) =

American illustrator

- Born: ca. 1995 (age 30–31); San Francisco, California, U.S.
- Other name: Smug Morenita
- Occupations: Illustrator, painter
- Movement: Pop art, Latin American art
- Website: Official website

Gabriela Alemán (born c. 1995), also known online as Smug Morenita, is an American visual artist and illustrator. She is a self-taught artist who creates comic-styled pop art that depicts Latinx culture and iconography.

== Biography ==
Alemán was born and raised in San Francisco, California, U.S.. She is a self-identified queer woman and a first-generation American. She is the daughter of immigrants from Nicaragua and El Salvador. Alemán grew up in the Mission District of San Francisco, where her family was once evicted from their home during the "early dot-com boom".

== Career ==
In 2019, Alemán helped to design and create the artwork for the Loteria cards passed out during the #MissionLoteria initiative in San Francisco. On December 14, 2019 Alemán was one of the artists featured at the 6th annual multidisciplinary exhibition at the Acción Latina’s Juan R. Fuentes Gallery. On February 5, 2020, Alemán was featured at the Galería de La Raza with the opening of the exhibit titled In The Name Of…?. In addition to being an artist, Gabriela Alemán is also a community organizer and activist. At 26 years old, Alemán co-founds the Mission Meals Coalition in order to provide fresh ingredients and meals to those in need. Alemán and her sisters created the coalition during the COVID-19 pandemic in 2020. They started out by delivering meals and groceries but now manage a community fridge providing free ingredients. The Mission Meals Coalition does not receive any government funding and is kept running by donations and volunteers. Donated items are inspected carefully and determined as safe to eat. Alemán also makes sure that many of the groceries offered are widely accepted by the Latinx community. Alemán is also the co-president of Latin@ Young Democrats of San Francisco and acted as a part time campaign manager for Gabriela López. She has also worked as a Calle 24 council member, and a Chavalos de Aqui y Allá board member.

== Works ==
- During the 2019 #MissionLoteria initiative in San Francisco, Alemán worked alongside artist Ivan C. Lopez, and Valeria Olguín to design Loteria cards.
- In 2019, Alemán's artwork was featured at the 6th annual multidisciplinary exhibition at the Acción Latina’s Juan R. Fuentes Gallery.
- Alemán's artwork was featured at the Galería de La Raza with the opening of the exhibit titled In The Name Of…?.
- Some of Alemán's artwork is featured on the website for The Center for Cultural Power.
- In 2019, Alemán did an illustration for a magazine published by El Tecolote.
- On January 14, 2019, Alemán's artwork was on view at The Ramp Gallery.
- Alemán did illustrations for Disney+ and Wells Fargo.
