= Carnaval San Francisco =

Annual street parade

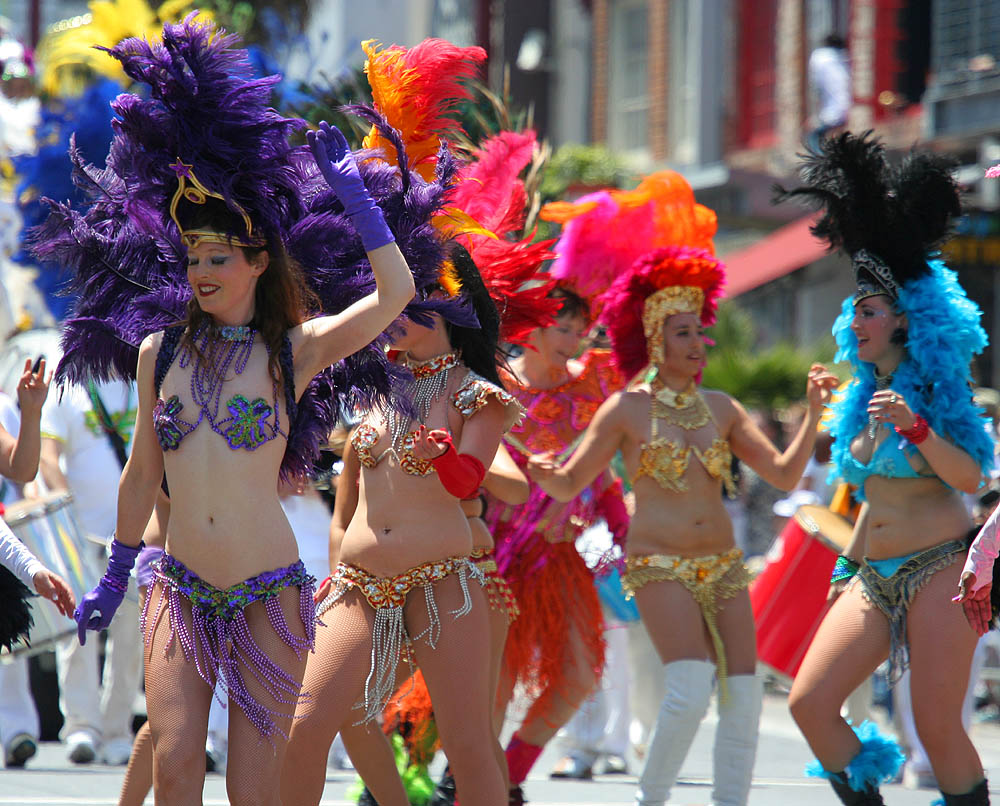
Performers from the parade.

Carnaval San Francisco, established 1979, is an annual street parade and festival in San Francisco, California, United States, held on the last weekend in May.

== About ==
Carnaval San Francisco, is a free two-day annual family festival in San Francisco's Mission District over Memorial Day weekend, held on Harrison Street between 16th and 24th Streets, Guests can experience global cuisine, international music, dance, arts and crafts, and other activities and entertainment.

== History ==
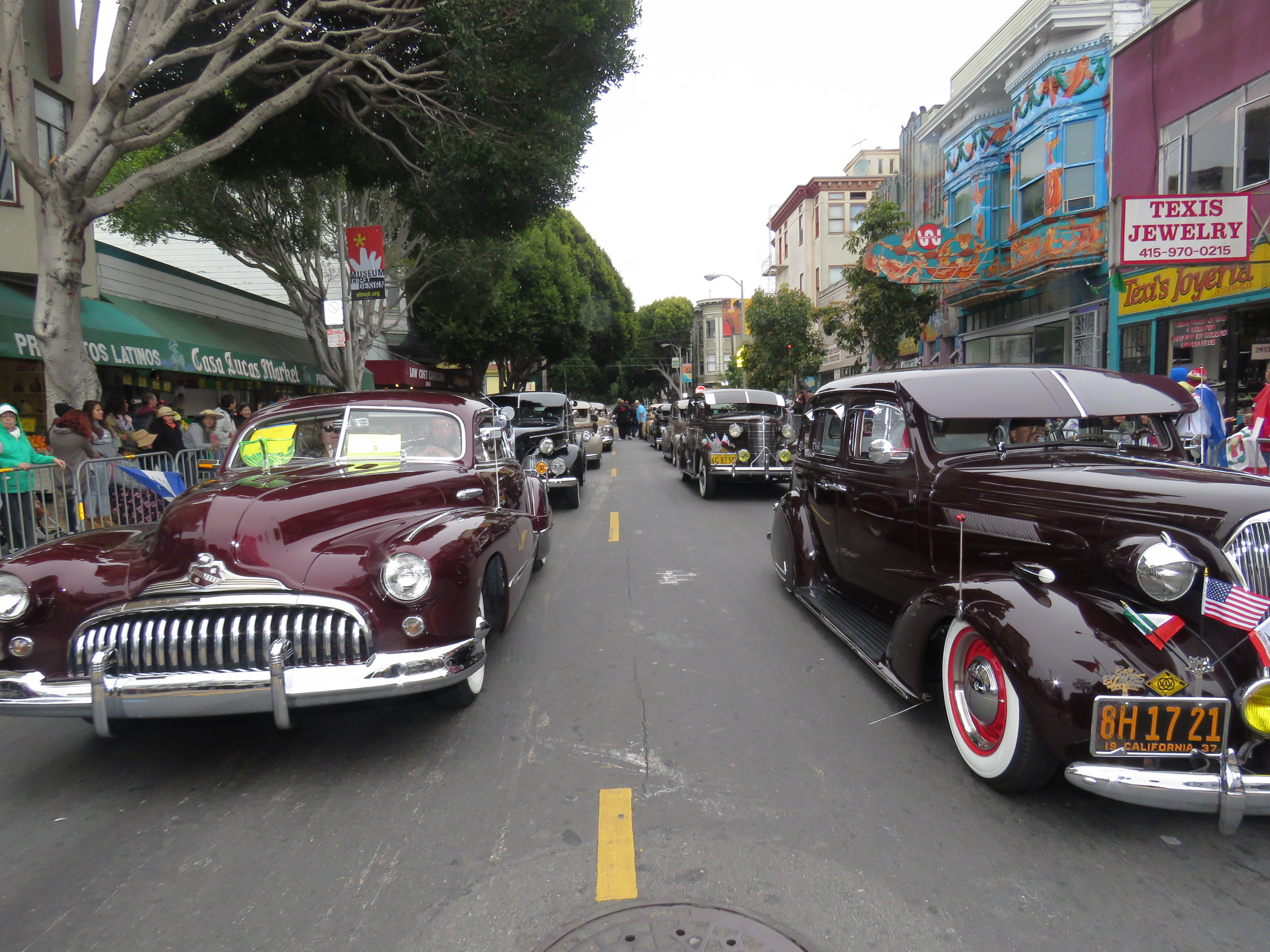
Lowriders in the parade procession.

Carnaval San Francisco was founded by a group of artists organized by percussionist Marcus Gordon, dancer Adela Chu, percussionist John Santos, activist Sir Lawrence and costume designer Pam Minor in 1979, who came together in Precita Park. The second Carnaval San Francisco was held in the Mission District's Dolores Park.

Since 2003, the Carnaval Grand Parade has run through Calle 24 in the Mission District of San Francisco. The event is produced by Mission Neighborhood Centers as a fundraiser for youth, children, family and senior programs. The Cultural Arts Committee (CAC) of MNC together with the Carnaval Advisory Committee oversee the administration of the parade and festival, which contract with long-time Mission District activist Roberto Hernandez to run the event. For the 2009 Carnaval the production of the parade and festival was turned over to event production company Rita Barela & Associates, while the CAC produced the other official events including the King and Queen Competition.

In 2016, the theme "¡Viva La Madre Tierra!" celebrated Mother Earth's prevalence in many cultures worldwide as the manifestation of the natural world. There was a virtual carnaval in 2020.

== Special events ==
=== VIP Party at the de Young Museum ===
The de Young Museum hosts the official Carnaval Kick Off Party the week before the festival and parade. This free event features energetic dancers, fabulous costumes and a preview of what's to come at the Mission District extravaganza.

=== King and Queen Competition ===
In April, Carnaval San Francisco embarks on a journey to select the annual King and Queen. Contestants vie for the crowns with performances in Carnaval costumes, sometimes accompanied by other dancers and musicians. The winners of the competition will be crowned as King and Queen of the Annual Carnaval San Francisco Parade and Festival held at the end of May. Contest winners serve as the Official Ambassadors at the Carnaval San Francisco Grand Parade and win a $500 cash prize.

=== Season Kick-Off: Fat Tuesday ===
In February, Carnaval San Francisco invites everyone to meet their neighbors and make new friends at their Annual Fat Tuesday Mardi Gras Celebration at three venues in the Mission. This features live music and dancers winding their way through the party. Fat Tuesday is the event which kicks off the Carnaval SF season. Guests can wear costumes, masks and beads and celebrate Fat Tuesday in true Carnaval SF style.

== See also ==
- Mission Cultural Center for Latino Arts
