= Potrero del Sol Park =

Park in San Francisco, California, United States

Coordinates: 37.7506°N 122.4050°W

Potrero del Sol Park, San Francisco Potrero del Sol Park, formally known as “La Raza Park,” is an urban park located at the intersection of Potrero Avenue and 25th St in the Calle 24 Latino Cultural District within San Francisco’s Mission District. The 4.5 acre park houses San Francisco’s largest skate park, a large event and performance space, and a community garden.

Potrero del Sol Park hosts Phono del Sol music festival, organized by Noise Pop, every June and the Día de los Muertos Festival of Altars every November.

== History ==
In 1974, Jack Wickert and Bonnie Sherk, along with many artists and community activists, converted an abandoned former milk factory into a model farm and environmental school for children. The farm eventually grew to house 70 farm animals and held an event space for art shows, festivals, and youth gatherings. This farm was lost in a legal battle with landlords in 1987 but the community garden, one of the largest in the city, still remains on the grounds.

In the late-1970s and early-1980s, the park was known locally as “La Raza Park,” and was central to local youth gatherings and lowrider culture. The park was modeled after People’s Park in Berkeley. On July 2, 2008, local professional skateboarder Jake Phelps and then mayor Gavin Newsom cut the ribbon Potrero del Sol Park's skate park, the largest in the city.

== See also ==
- The Farm (San Francisco)
