= Girls Club (San Francisco) =

- U.S. National Register of Historic Places
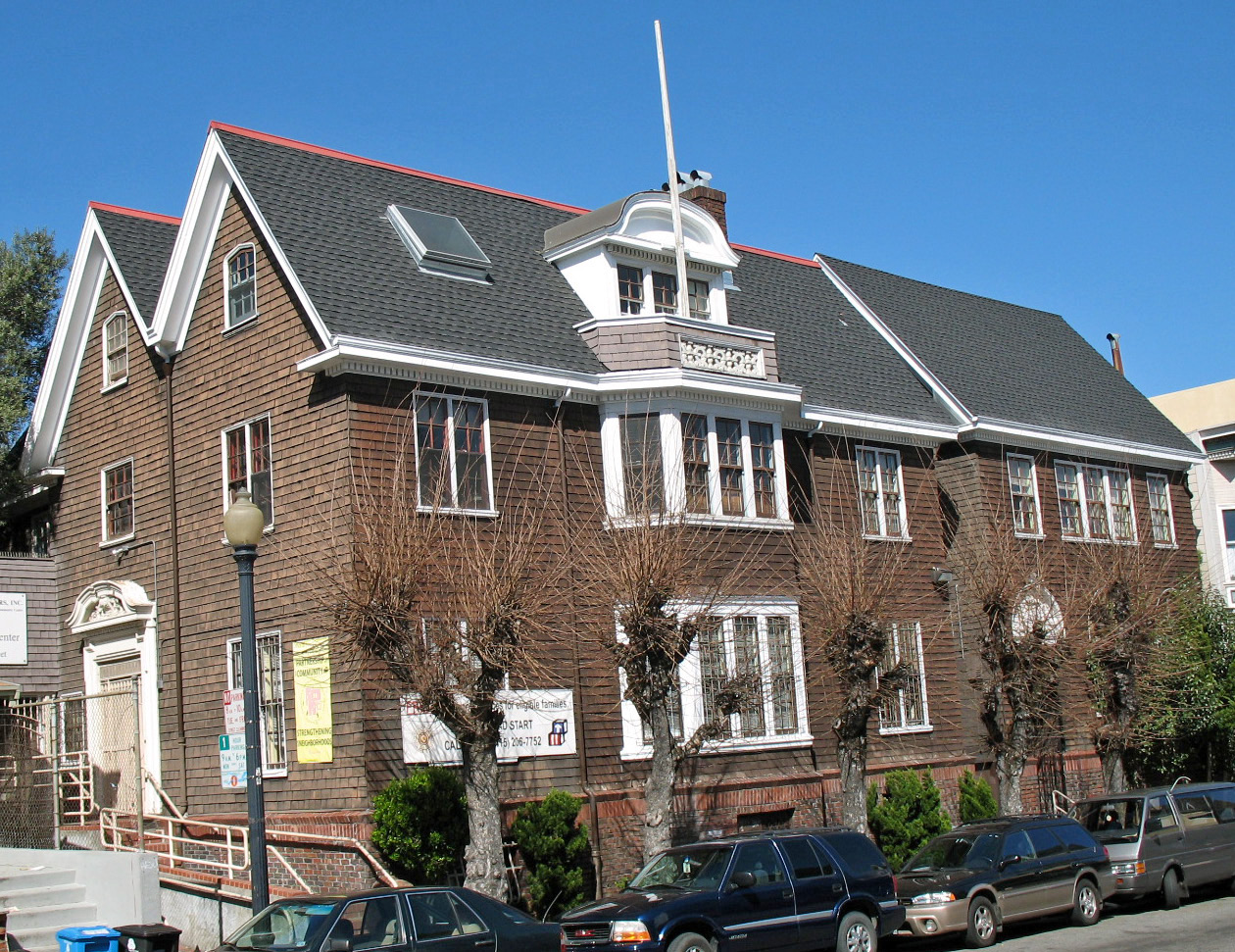

- Location within San Francisco Location within California Location within the United States
- Location: 362 Capp St., San Francisco, California
- Coordinates: 37.7610°N 122.4185°W
- Area: 0.3 acres (0.12 ha)
- Built: 1911
- Built by: L.A. Kern
- Architects: Ward & Blohme
- Architectural style: Shingle Style, Bay Area Tradition
- NRHP reference No.: 79000531
- Added to NRHP: November 6, 1979

The Girls Club in San Francisco, California, also known as Mission Neighborhood Capp St. Center, was built in 1911, in the First Bay Tradition version of Shingle Style architecture. The building was used as a clubhouse for girls and neighborhood center, similar to the Boys Club of America.

It was listed on the National Register of Historic Places in 1979. According to its NRHP nomination:

"The Mission Neighborhood Capp Street Center is significant for the quality of its design and its role in the history of social movements in San Francisco. Built in 1911, the building is an excellent example of the First Bay Tradition. This regional interpretation of the Shingle Style was characterized by the use of shingles and stained wood and picturesque changes in spatial and axial arrangement. Its major practitioners were Ernest Coxhead, Willis Polk, Bernard Maybeck and Julia Morgan. The skillful execution of the design of the Mission Neighborhood Capp Street Center makes it a significant expression of this genre."

The building is a two-and-a-half-story wood-frame structure. The 1911-built building with theatre was expanded by 1923 addition of a gymnasium, making a U-shaped complex. There is an inner courtyard and a brick alley way. The main entrance porch is capped with a Georgian-style broken pediment. The upper stories' surface is dark brown shingles. The theatre has small stage, a beamed ceiling and a balcony level. After a fire in the 1940s a sprinkler system was added.

A social worker at the Columbia Park Boys Club, Rachel Wolfsohn, saw the need for an equivalent service for girls, and she founded the San Francisco Girls Club at the turn of the century.
