= California Cultural Districts =

Cultural Districts of California

California Cultural Districts are cultural districts that are officially designated by the state of California. The program began in 2015 and is organized by the California Arts Council as a means to support local art, boost tourism, and preserve historic sites. The selection process is highly competitive and attracts applicants from across California.

As of December 2025, there are 17 active California Cultural Districts and 10 have been announced for January 1, 2026.

== List of Cultural Districts ==
In 2017, the first 14 California Cultural Districts were announced. In December 2025, an additional 10 cultural districts were announced for January 1, 2026.

Name	City	County	Designation date
Balboa Park Cultural District	San Diego	San Diego	2017
Barrio Logan Cultural District	San Diego	San Diego	2017
The BLVD Cultural District	Lancaster	Los Angeles	2017
The Calle 24 Latino Cultural District	San Francisco	San Francico	2017
Downtown San Rafael Arts District	San Rafael	Marin	2017
Eureka Cultural Arts District	Eureka	Humboldt	2017
Grass Valley-Nevada City Cultural District	Grass Valley and Nevada City	Nevada	2017
Little Tokyo	Los Angeles	Los Angeles	2017
Oceanside Cultural District	Oceanside	San Diego	2017
Redding Cultural District	Redding	Shasta	2017
Rotten City-Emeryville Cultural Arts District	Emeryville	Alameda	2017
San Pedro Arts & Cultural District	Los Angeles	Los Angeles	2017
SOMA Pilipinas	San Francisco	San Francisco	2017
Truckee Cultural District	Truckee	Nevada	2017
American Indian Cultural District	San Francisco	San Francico	January 1, 2026 to December 31, 2030
The Arts and Culture District	Riverside	Riverside	January 1, 2026 to December 31, 2030
Arts District Liberty Station	San Diego	San Diego	January 1, 2026 to December 31, 2030
Black Arts Movement Business District	Oakland	Alameda	January 1, 2026 to December 31, 2030
Dos Rios Arts and Culture District	Modesto	Stanislaus	January 1, 2026 to December 31, 2030
Downtown Merced Cultural District	Merced	Merced	January 1, 2026 to December 31, 2030
Downtown Oxnard Cultural District	Oxnard	Ventura	January 1, 2026 to December 31, 2030
Historic South Los Angeles Black Cultural District	Los Angeles	Los Angeles	January 1, 2026 to December 31, 2030
San Jose Japantown	San Jose	Santa Clara	January 1, 2026 to December 31, 2030
Watsonville Cultural District	Watsonville	Santa Cruz	January 1, 2026 to December 31, 2030
