= Juan Gonzales =

American journalist

- Born: Juan Gonzales; 1948 (age 77–78); Stockton, California, United States
- Education: San Francisco State University
- Occupations: Journalist and college instructor
- Years active: 1970–present
- Notable credit: Founder of El Tecolote

Juan Gonzales (born 1948) is an American journalist. He is the founder and was the first editor of the bilingual newspaper El Tecolote. El Tecolote is the longest running English-Spanish newspaper in California.

== Early life ==
He was born and raised in east Stockton. He is the son of U.S. farmworkers. He attended Franklin High School. He worked as a writer and editor for his high school paper. When he attended San Francisco State University he wrote and edited for the university's newspaper. He graduated from San Francisco State University in 1968.

== The early beginnings of El Tecolote ==
When he began his teaching career at San Francisco State University there was a lot of social and political changes taking place. El Tecolote came out of this social activism. The newspaper came out of a La Raza Studies class that had been created by him. The Final part of the class work was to create a bilingual newspaper that was both written in Spanish and English. He was its founder and first editor. It came out on August 24, 1970. It was given the Spanish name of El Tecolote, which means The Owl in English. The wise owl is its signature logo. The paper about a year later moved out of its college setting and into the Mission District. It started as a bi-monthly, four-page tabloid with a press run of 5,000.

== The need for a Latino community newspaper ==
Juan Gonzales like many others thought there was a strong need for the creation of a bilingual local newspaper for the Latino community in the Mission District of San Francisco. To many, the mainstream media did not cover enough of the Latino news in the Mission. Many felt Latinos in the area were dealing with issues that the bigger papers did not pay much attention to. Juan has said about this need: "We started the paper in order to voice out through the community's perspective." And many in the Latino community did not speak or read English, making it very difficult to get local news that affected them. He also believed a small Latino newspaper was just as important as any major newspaper, especially if it covered stories about issues that was affecting that person. El Tecolote does not just cover the day-to-day life of the Latino community in the Mission, it also has tried to cover all the major social and political events concerning Latinos, from bilingual services and gentrification to trying to humanize the plight of undocumented people. And the newspaper has focused on reducing poor government services, high dropout rates among Latinos, and police brutality.

== Advocating and practicing social activism ==
Juan Gonzales doesn't believe in journalistic objectivity and has often advocated for the Latinos in San Francisco. He does believe journalists can be fair and should always practice accuracy and journalistic ethics, but he does not believe it is possible to be objective as a journalist. El Tecolote is a mission-driven newspaper, purposely and consciously trying to bring about progressive social change. Having an unapologetic very liberal view and promoting community activism has always been a central theme of the newspaper. Juan Gonzales considers the paper as an advocate for the continuation of the quest for Latino Civil Rights.

== Career ==
As an instructor he has taught journalism for fifteen years at San Francisco State University. It was here when he taught the first college-level course on Hispanic journalism titled La Raza Journalism. Then he went on to become an instructor of journalism for City College of San Francisco where he became chair of the Department of Journalism. And as he taught, he has also worked as a publisher, editor, reporter, and columnist. In the 1970s and 1980s he worked as a reporter for United Press International and the Associated Press. Today he still helps out occasionally with the running of El Tecolote, offering advice, acting as a public face for the newspaper, and also seeking resources for the paper.

== Awards ==
He has received a Heroes of Excellence Award from KGO-TV. In 2000, he was honored by the Society of Professional Journalists with its Distinguished Service Award. In 2009, he was inducted into the National Association of Hispanic Journalists Hall of Fame for advancing the interests of journalism and the interests of Latinos in Journalism. In 2011, Horace Mann Middle School had him depicted in a mural on an exterior of a wall. In March 2015 he accepted a certificate of recognition from Mayor Ed Lee for his 45 years of service as a publisher, journalism teacher, and for being a department chair of journalism.
