= St. John's Chapel, Del Monte =

Episcopal Church in California

- St. John's Chapel
- U.S. National Register of Historic Places
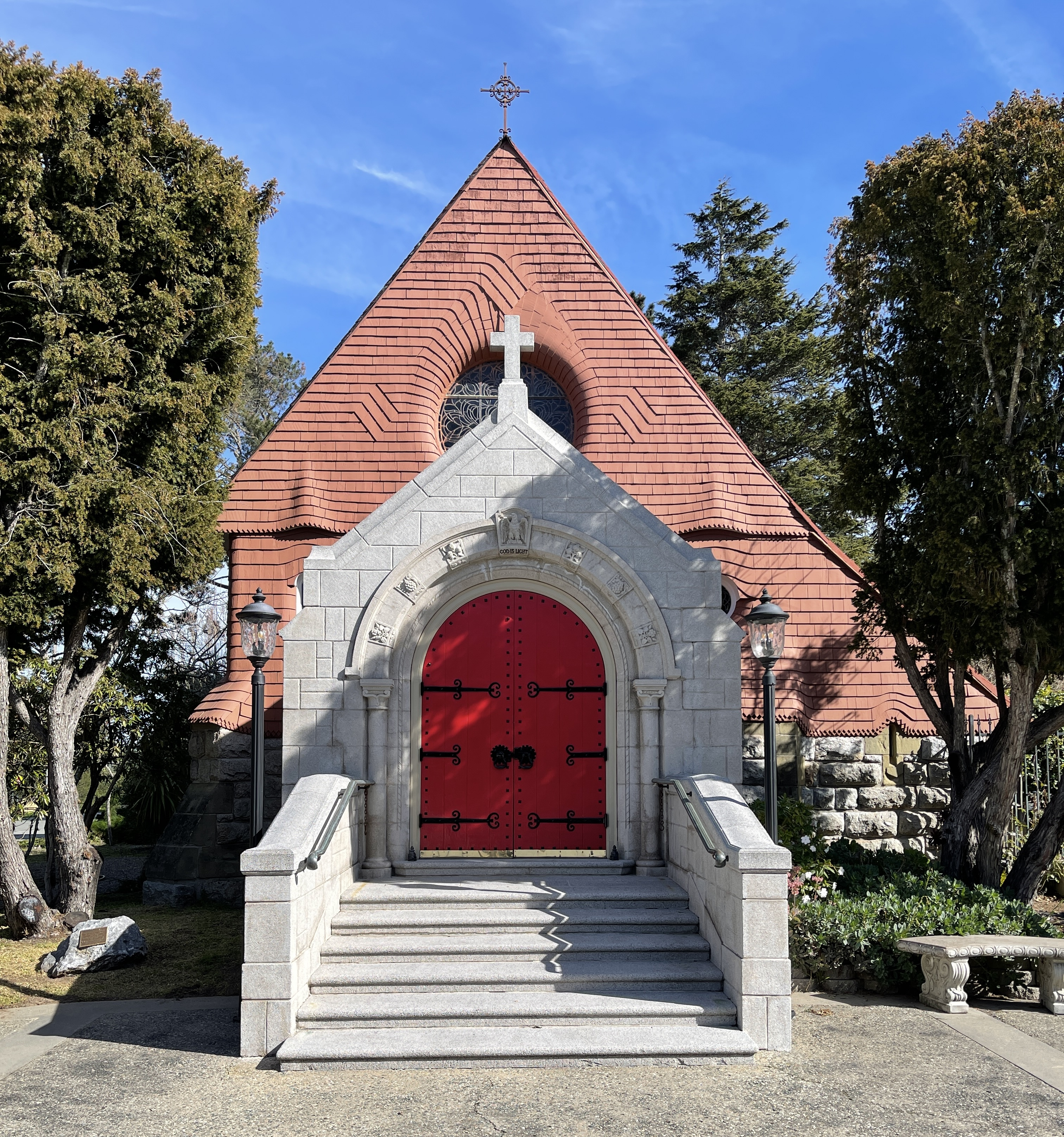
- St. John's Chapel, Del Monte.

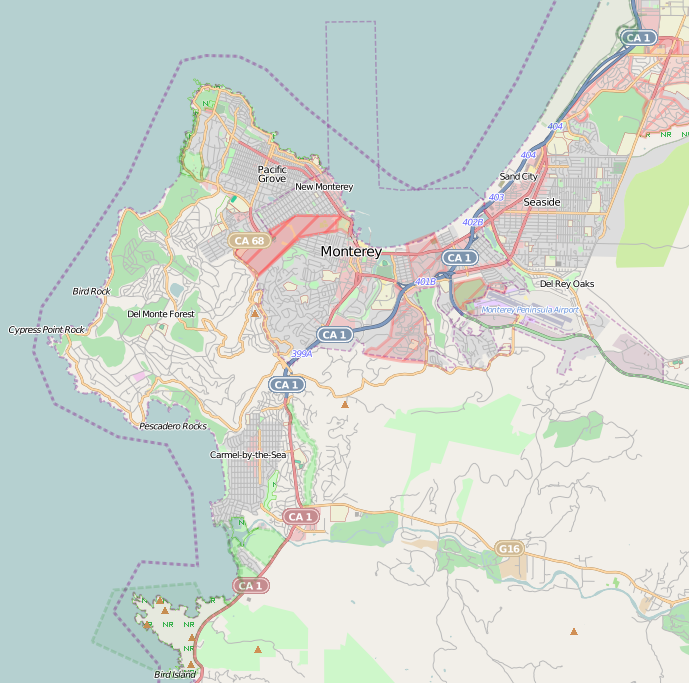
- Location within Monterey Peninsula
- Location: 1490 Mark Thomas Dr., Monterey, California
- Coordinates: 36°28′38″N 121°44′22″W
- Built: June 14, 1891
- Architect: Ernest Coxhead
- Architectural style: Shingle style architecture
- NRHP reference No.: 100005719
- Added to NRHP: October 21, 2020

St. John's Chapel, Del Monte is a parish of the Diocese of El Camino Real Episcopal Church in Monterey, California, founded in 1891. Intended for guests at the Hotel Del Monte, the property was donated by railroad tycoon Charles Crocker. St. John's Chapel is an example of an Episcopal church designed by architect Ernest Coxhead, with his shingle style architecture. The Chapel was listed on the National Register of Historic Places on October 21, 2020.

== History ==
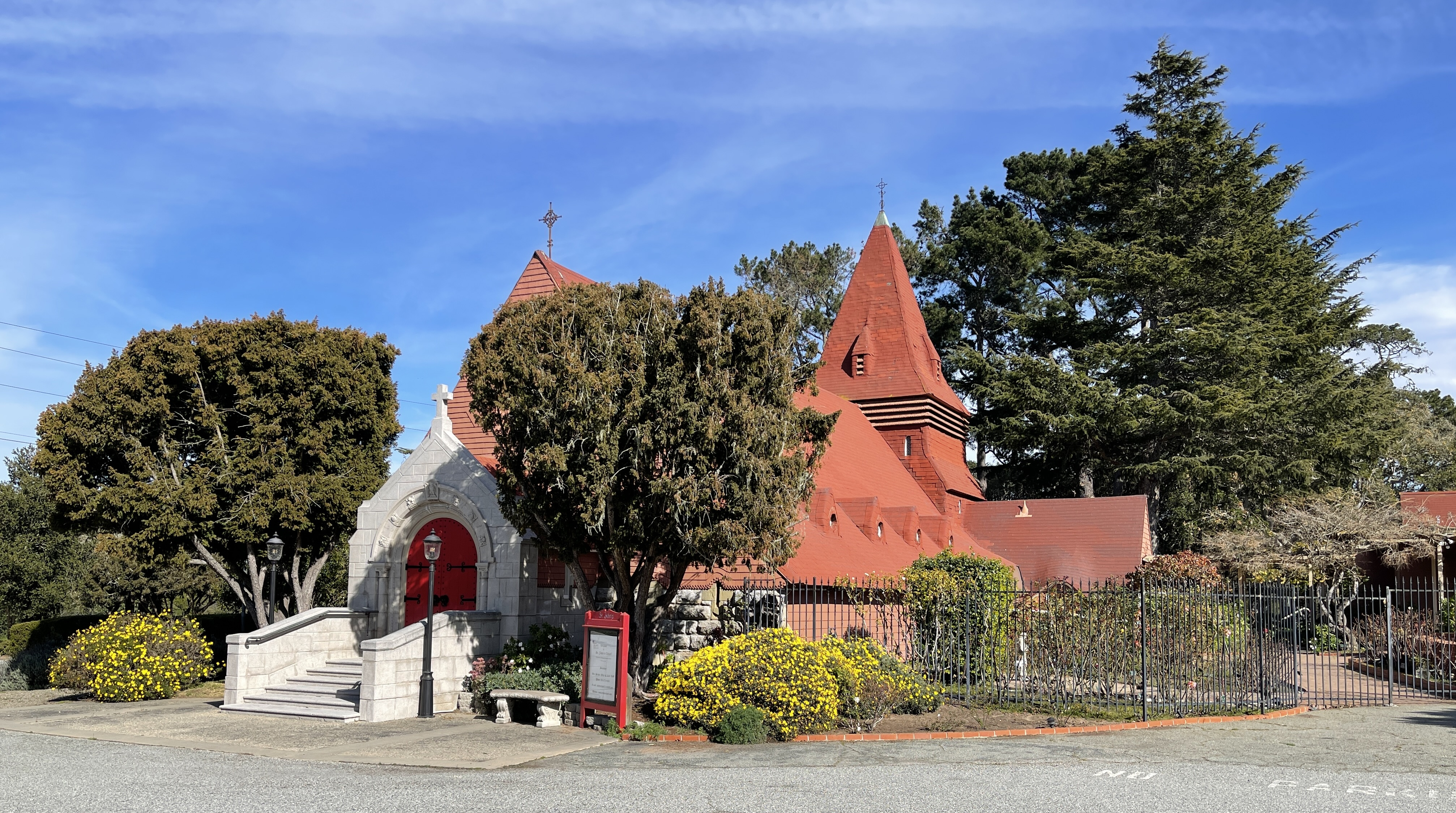
St. John's Chapel, Del Monte.

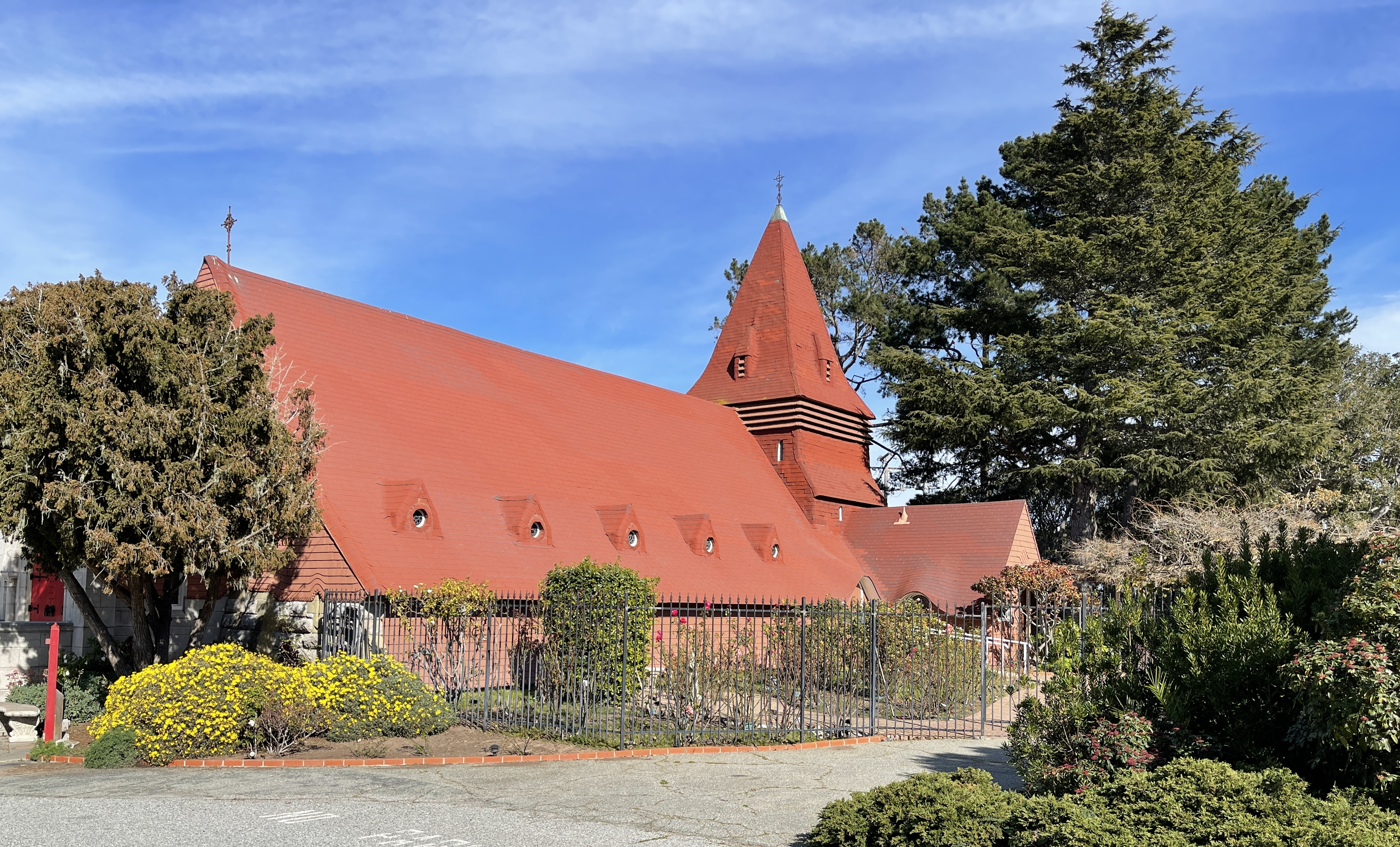
St. John's Chapel side view.

St. John's Chapel, Del Monte is a Late Victorian Shingle Style, traditionally cross-shaped, single story, 2,329 square feet (216.4 m^{2}) building with a 110-foot-high steeple and bell tower.

The chapel was dedicated on June 14, 1891, by Suffragan bishop the Rt. Rev. William Ford Nichols of the Diocese of California. The Shingle style architecture style chapel has an English cottage look. It was designed by Ernest Coxhead, an English-born architect, who designed and built churches and residences in California. It is an example of Coxhead's "idiosyncratic, dollhouse-style churches."

In 1903, President Theodore Roosevelt worshiped at St. John's Chapel while staying at the Hotel del Monte. In the decades since, several movie stars were married at St. John's Chapel, including Brian Aherne and Joan Fontaine (1939) and Brooke Shields and Andre Agassi (1997). After the Naval Postgraduate School moved into the former Hotel del Monte, both naval and other military personnel, as well as locals and visitors, have provided new memberships.

In 1957, to make room for a newly planned state highway, it was necessary to move the chapel 560 ft (170 m) to its present location on Mark Thomas Drive in Monterey. When the chapel was moved, an additional twenty feet were added to the west end of the nave and a narthex was added, designed by award-winning Architect, Robert Stanton. A memorial vestibule and front porch, added to the building in 1941, provided an additional 9.6 ft (2.9 m) to the granite stairs.
