= San Francisco Cultural Districts =

Neighborhood of San Francisco, US

San Francisco Cultural Districts are neighborhoods of San Francisco, California, United States that are officially designated by the City and County of San Francisco government. The Cultural Districts Program oversees the designations and support for the neighborhoods. These neighborhoods receive special funding and support for community programs and preservation from the Mayor's Office of Housing and Community Development.

Official designations began in 2013 with Japantown. Later an official program was created. After the program to support the neighborhoods was created by the Mayor and Board of Supervisors in May 2018, city voters also passed Proposition E in November 2018 in support of the program. A goal of the designations and corresponding program are to prevent gentrification.

== List of Neighborhoods ==
The following are the neighborhoods and years that they received the designation:

- Japantown Cultural District, 2013
- Calle 24 Latino Cultural District within the Mission District, 2014
- SoMa Philipinas District, 2016
- The Transgender District, 2017
- Leather and LGBTQ Cultural District, 2018
- The African American Arts and Cultural District, which consists of Bayview-Hunters Point, San Francisco and some surrounding areas, 2018
- Castro LGBTQ Cultural District, 2019
- American Indian Cultural District, within the Mission District and some nearby areas, 2020
- Sunset Chinese Cultural District, within the Sunset District, 2021
- Pacific Islander Cultural District, within the Visitacion Valley, 2022
