= The Farm (San Francisco) =

Community center San Francisco, California

Coordinates: 37.74934°N 122.40488°W

The Farm, (founded 1974) also known as Crossroads Community, was an environmental art and performance art project that also operated as a community center. The Farm was located at the corner of Army Street (later renamed Cesar Chavez Street) and Potrero Avenue in San Francisco, California, from 1974 to 1987. It was founded by Bonnie Ora Sherk and Jack Wickert in 1974. The open space incorporated a major freeway interchange and is now the site of Potrero del Sol Park (formally La Raza Park).

Sherk referred to the thirteen year-long project as an "environmental sculpture" where edible crops were grown, livestock were raised and educational programming took place. Sherk spoke of the project: "We're attempting to reconnect people and humanize environments" and that the "growth process in life is like the creative process in art."

== History ==
“In the city, things tend to be very fragmented, and the freeway is a symbol of that fragmentation,”

— Bonnie Ora Sherk

Adults and children would gather at The Farm which was across a park from Buena Vista Elementary School. Children from Buena Vista would visit the Farm for field trips or go to the Farm after school.

The Farm had a two-story building; the lower story contained an actual farm, with vegetable gardens, chickens, geese, rabbits, and goats. Upstairs was a library and an art gallery. Also on the bottom level was a pre-school. The Farm would put on DIY shows to raise funds.

Sherk departed in 1980 after the city parks department decided to reclaim one of the Farm's lots and turn it into a traditional urban park. Later directors turned the Farm into a punk rock showcase by night, by partnering with mobile garage productions run by Craig Shell and Bill Gould (of faith no more), infamous for staging seminal 1980s punk rock bands such as Frightwig, Discharge, Camper Van Beethoven, the Descendents, the Mentors, 7 Seconds, MDC (Millions of Dead Cops), RKL, Dirty Rotten Imbeciles, Raw Power, the Accused, Redd Kross, Soundgarden, the Gits, the Lookouts (early band of Green Day drummer), Bad Brains, and many more.

'80s punk shows at The Farm, such as the Black Flag / Redd Kross show on November 16, 1984, attracted notable figures including Kevin Thatcher and Mofo of Thrasher Magazine, along with members of The Faction.

Buildings in the same complex also housed Survival Research Laboratories, Goforaloop Gallery, Subterranean Records, and CoreOS.
