= Bonnie Sherk =

American artist (1945–2021)

Bonnie Ora Sherk
- Bonnie Ora Sherk in the early 1970s
- Born: Bonnie Ora Kellner; May 18, 1945; New Bedford, Massachusetts, U.S.
- Died: August 8, 2021 (aged 76); San Francisco, California, U.S.
- Education: Rutgers University, San Francisco State University
- Occupations: Landscape artist, performance artist, landscape planner, educator

Bonnie Ora Sherk (née Bonnie Ora Kellner; May 18, 1945 – August 8, 2021) was an American landscape-space artist, performance artist, landscape planner, and educator. She was the founder of The Farm, and A Living Library. Sherk was a professional artist who exhibited her work in museums and galleries around the world. Her work has also been published in art books, journals, and magazines. Her work is considered a pioneering contribution to Eco Art.

== Early life ==
Bonnie Ora Kellner was born on May 18, 1945, in New Bedford, Massachusetts. She grew up in Montclair, New Jersey. Her father Sydney Kellner was the area director of the American Jewish Committee and lecturer of art and architecture. Her mother was a first grade teacher.

Sherk graduated Douglass College, Rutgers University in the 1960s. She studied under Robert Watts at Rutgers, who taught her about the Fluxus movement. She later enrolled in an MFA program at San Francisco State University.

== Career ==
Sherk moved to San Francisco in the late 1960s with her husband David Sherk.

Sherk developed a systemic, place-based approach to environmental transformation and education which links systems - biological, cultural, technological. Integrated with such innovations, like Green-Powered Digital Gateways, Sherk's approach incorporated interdisciplinary, standards-based, hands-on learning, community ecological planning and design, and state-of-the-art communications and technologies. Sherk's goal was to integrate local resources to make relevant ecological transformations, which are integrated with hands-on learning opportunities and community programs.

In a 2012 interview with Peter Cavagnaro, Sherk shared her love and passion for the environment. She believes that the environment is a "beautiful" and "diverse" place and that it is the most practical place for art and to create transformation, because it has the ability to reach communities near and far.

== Group exhibitions ==
- 1967–1974, State of Mind: New California Art Circa 1970. Berkeley, California
- 2014, Vegetation As Political Agent, PAV, Parco Arte Vivente, Turin, Italy
- 2017, Venice Biennale, Viva Arte Viva, May 13 - November 16, 2017.
- 2019, Territorios que importan. Arte, Género, Ecologia, CDAN, Centro de Arte y Naturaleza, Huesca, Spain.

== Works ==
=== Portable Parks I-III (1970) ===
Portable Parks I-III (1970, with Howard Levine).

=== A Living Library (1980s–2021) ===
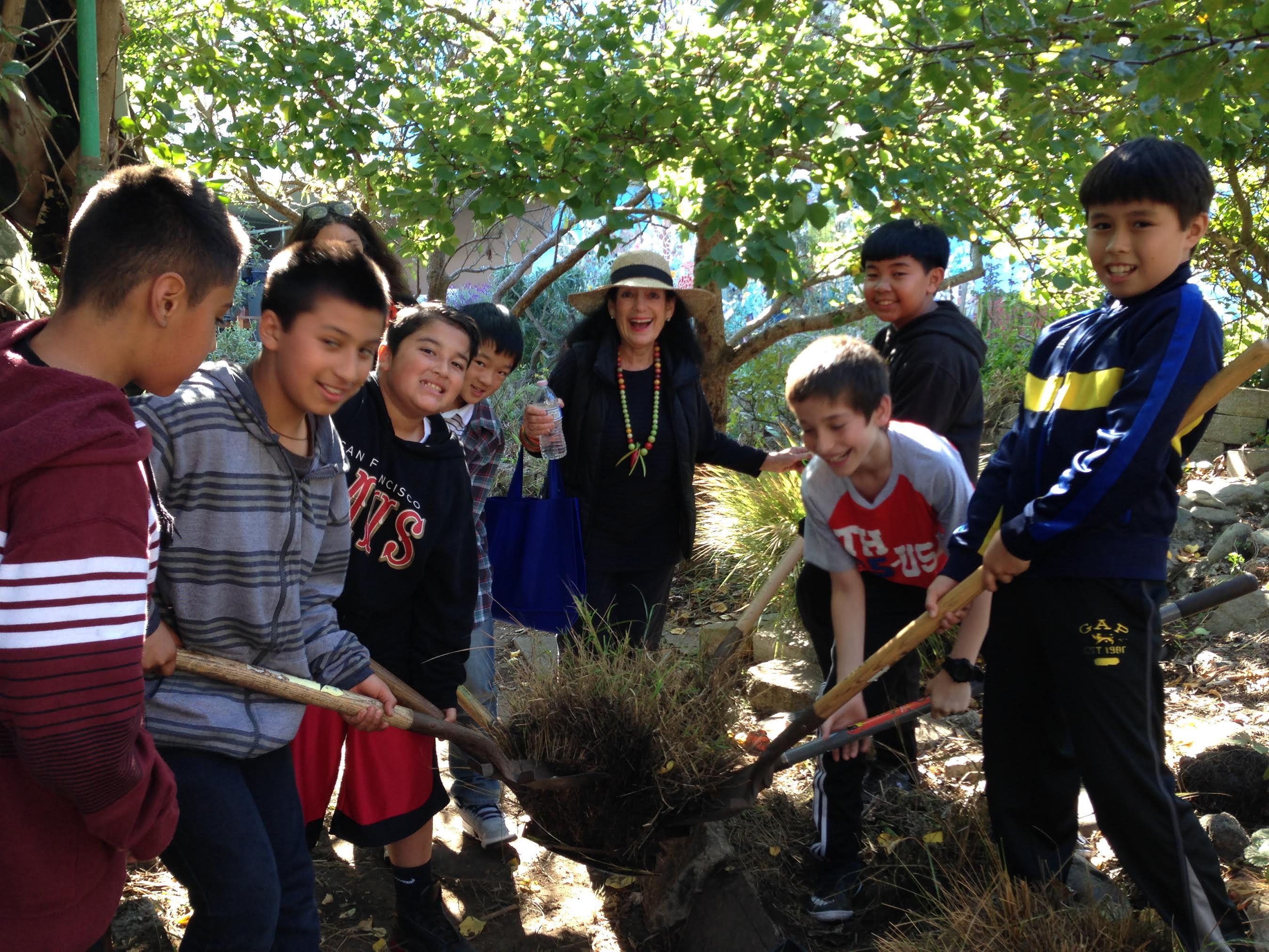
Sherk working with kids at A Branch Living Library & Think Park

A Living Library was Sherk's ongoing work she began in March 1981, which consisted of natural environments in urban areas that functioned as community and educational spaces. Transforming buried urban streams and asphalted public spaces, into thriving art gardens. She established these spaces in order to build education centers children and outreach opportunities for communities in San Francisco and New York City.

"A Living Library is a planetary genre, developing locally and globally. Branch Living Library and Think Parks incorporate local resources--human, ecological, economic, historic, technological, aesthetic--seen through the lens of time--past, present, future"—Bonnie Ora Sherk

Participants receive green-skills job training, and learn about environmental issues. In the late 1990s and 2000s, Sherk established projects that are currently overseen by the A.L.L. staff team. The two San Francisco locations highlighted in this gallery relate to the Isalis Creek Watershed: the Bernal Heights Living Library and Think Park Nature Walk (2002–present) and the OMI/Excelsior Living Library & Think Park (1998–present).

Sherk additionally created branches on Roosevelt Island. New York City (2001–present), and formerly in San Francisco's Chinatown from 2007 to 2016. A.L.L. fosters place-based ecological transformation of communities and schools with integrated hands-on learning programs. The ongoing work aims to create expansive and resilient ecological landscapes. Sherk additionally represented A.L.L. as a socially-engaged artwork in exhibition contexts including the 2017 Venice Biennale.

=== The Farm (1974–1980) ===
Created by Sherk and co-founder Jack Wickert in 1974 and lasting through 1987, The Farm (also known as Crossroads Community) was a 7-acre eco garden and art space that spreads across traffic meridians and underused spaces under freeway overpasses. Through engagement with the natural, in a heavily urbanized region, The Farm became a place created to suit the people of San Francisco's needs. It was an art space, it provided educational activities for children, and acted as a public park throughout its duration.

Sherk felt that people lacked a “spiritual and ecological balance within ourselves and larger groups and nations,” and felt that a space like the Farm could offer a solution to this issue through community connection, education, and creating a space within the urban landscape to uncover the natural environment that exists within the landscape and demonstrate our connection to life and the ecosystem.

=== Living In The Forest ===
Living In The Forest: Demonstrations of Atkin Logic, Balance, Compromise, Devotion, Etc. was an installation created in 1973 for De Saisset Museum in Santa Clara, conceived as "a metaphor for life in all of its aspects, including birth, death, struggles for survival, compromise, living our daily lives, etc."

=== Public Lunch ===
Public Lunch was one of Sherk's most well-known performance pieces. The piece consisted of Bonnie eating lunch in The Lion House at the San Francisco Zoo, while in an empty, though identical, cage adjacent to the lion's and tiger's enclosures. Her performance began with her entering into the cage the same way in which the animals do— from an outdoor cage with a small hatch into the space. The lunch itself was served by the lion keeper, and consisted of a cigarette, followed by a plate of steak, green beans, and a baked potato, as well as a salad, a half-loaf of bread, a beverage, and other accompaniments. After the meal she rested on a raised shelf in the cage, while a tiger fed on the same shelf in the cage next to her. Following her performance, she left the cage the same way she entered it. She did this on a Saturday at 2pm in 1971, during normal feeding time and prime spectator watching. The performance also included a caged rat, in the enclosure with Sherk.

=== Sitting Still Series ===
In Bonnie Ora Sherk's Sitting Still Series, 1970 (digital projection, photo documentation of performances) the artist sat for approximately one hour in various locations around San Francisco as a means to subtly change the environment simply by becoming an unexpected part of it. At the first performance, Sherk, dressed in a formal evening gown, sat in an unholstered armchair amidst garbage and creek runoff from the construction of the Army Street freeway interchange. Facing slow moving traffic, her audience was the people driving by. The following month Sherk sat silently in the midst of a flooded city dump at California and Montgomery Streets. Other locations in the series included the Financial District, the Golden Gate Bridge, and the Bank of America plaza. Sherk also continued her piece at the San Francisco Zoo in a number of indoor and outdoor animal cages.

The Sitting Still series ultimately culminated in the performance Public Lunch, in which the artist ceremoniously ate an elaborately catered lunch in an empty cage located next to a cage of lions during public feeding time at the zoo.

The Sitting Still Series was exhibited in total as part of Public Works: Artists Interventions 1970s - Now, curated by Christian L. Frock and Tanya Zimbardo at Mills College Art Museum, September - December 2016; Sherk's first image from the series graces the cover of the exhibition catalogue designed by John Borruso. It most recently was shown at Fort Mason's Center for Arts and Culture exhibition, Bonnie Ora Sherk: Life Frames Since 1970.

== Awards ==
In 1970, the first SECA Vernal Equinox Special Award, which recognizes conceptual and experimental projects, was presented to Sherk and Howard Levine by the SFMOMA.

In 2001, Marion Rockefeller Weber's Arts and Healing Network awarded Sherk the 2001 AHN Award "for being an outstanding educator and for using her creativity to foster environmental healing."

== Personal ==
Sherk was married to David Sherk. The couple later divorced.

Sherk died on August 8, 2021, in San Francisco, California. She was buried on August 11 at the Mendocino Jewish Cemetery near the grave of her parents.
