= La Mejor Bakery =

Mexican bakery in San Francisco, United States

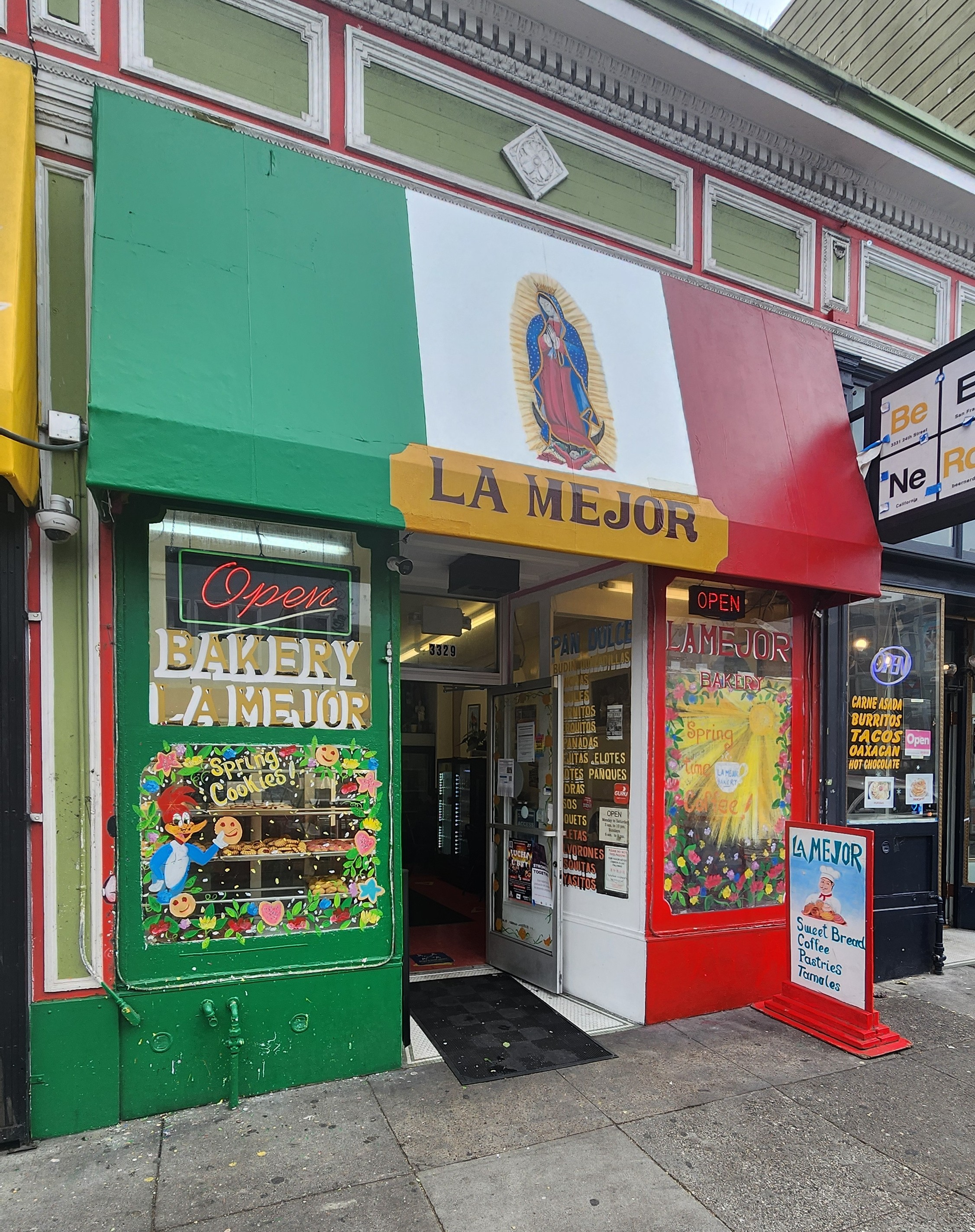
- Bakery storefront in Spring 2024
- Interactive map of La Mejor Bakery

Restaurant information
- Established: 1993
- Owner: Carmen Elias
- Food type: Pan dulce and other Mexican cuisine
- Location: 3329 24th Street, San Francisco, California, 98036, United States
- Coordinates: 37.7521°N 122.4194°W

La Mejor Bakery (Spanish: The Best) is a Mexican bakery located in the Mission District of San Francisco, California, in the United States. The bakery was recognized as a San Francisco legacy business in 2024 after 30 years of continuous operation at its sole location at 3329 24th Street.

== Description ==
The bakery sells varied pan dulce pastries, Mexican and Central American alike, and other foods such as empanadas and tamales. They also sell specific pastries during holiday seasons, such as rosca de reyes around Three Kings' Day and pan de muerto around the Day of the Dead. The pan de muerto made at La Mejor Bakery is provided to various elementary schools around the city to teach students about Mexican cuisine and culture.

The bakery also serves as a community space for Latin Americans in the Mission who may be alone in the United States and seek connection to the culture that they left behind.

The bakery provides Mexican pan dulce and other foods to events centered around 24th street.

The window art on the bakery's storefront is hand painted monthly by a local artist to reflect seasonal celebrations.

== History ==
La Mejor Bakery was opened by Carmen Elias in 1993 after her early retirement from working as a banker at Bank of America. Despite not having previous experience as a baker, Carmen grew up around bakeries as her father worked on the side as a sought-after baker in the Mission District. Carmen spent all of her retirement money on purchasing the failing bakery that would become La Mejor Bakery (Note: The bakery is named after either the bakery of Carmen Elias' family friend or a bakery that her father and his friends would frequent in Tijuana.) at the suggestion of one of her father's old co-workers who was also a family friend. The family friend provided her with mentorship on how to run a bakery and got her dad's old coworkers to bake for her on their days off.

The bakery wasn't profitable in its first two years as it was located in a bad neighborhood and didn't have a full-time staff. To attract more customers, Carmen would give away free cookies and open the bakery earlier, close in the middle of the day to rest, and stay open later than other nearby bakeries. As business and the neighborhood was improving, Carmen hired a young baker who recently immigrated from Mexico and he worked as her only full-time for 20 years before moving to nearby San Bruno to open his own bakery.

As of November 2022, all of the pan dulce made at La Mejor Bakery is prepared by three employees.

== Recognition ==
The bakery was recognized by San Francisco mayor Ed Lee as a Latino Heritage Business.

In 2015, The La Mejor Bakery was featured in San Francisco's entry in The New York Times' "36 Hours In" series. This popular series recommends eating establishments at cities around the world.

On February 27, 2023, the bakery was recognized by the city of San Francisco as a San Francisco legacy business for its cultural importance. This program allows businesses to participate in official city publicity campaigns and receive grants designed to help small businesses.

== See also ==
- List of bakeries
