= Ernest Coxhead =

English-born architect, active in the US

Ernest Albert Coxhead
- Born: 1863; Eastbourne, East Sussex, England
- Died: 27 March 1933 (aged 69–70); Berkeley, California, U.S.
- Education: Royal Academy of Arts, Architectural Association School of Architecture
- Occupation: Architect
- Practice: Coxhead and Coxhead

Ernest Albert Coxhead (1863–1933) was an English-born architect, active in the United States. He was trained in the offices of several English architects and attended the Royal Academy and the Architectural Association School of Architecture, both in London. He moved to California where he was the semi-official architect for the Episcopal Church. At the beginning of his career, Ernest Coxhead focused on designing churches, primarily in the Gothic Revival style. After the mid-1890s, Coxhead focused on residential designs. He was involved in the emergence of the Arts and Crafts style in California. He succeeded in designing residences that incorporated the elements and character of the English country house - shingled, Arts and Crafts style English Vernacular Cottages that combined elements from different periods for dramatic effect.

== Early life ==
Ernest Albert Coxhead was born in Eastbourne, East Sussex, the fourth of six children of William Coxhead, a retired schoolmaster. At the age of 15 Ernest became articled to civil engineer George Wallis. After five years experience in both public projects and residential developments, in 1883 Coxhead left Eastbourne for London. In London he worked for architect Frederic Chancellor, who restored gothic churches.

== Los Angeles ==
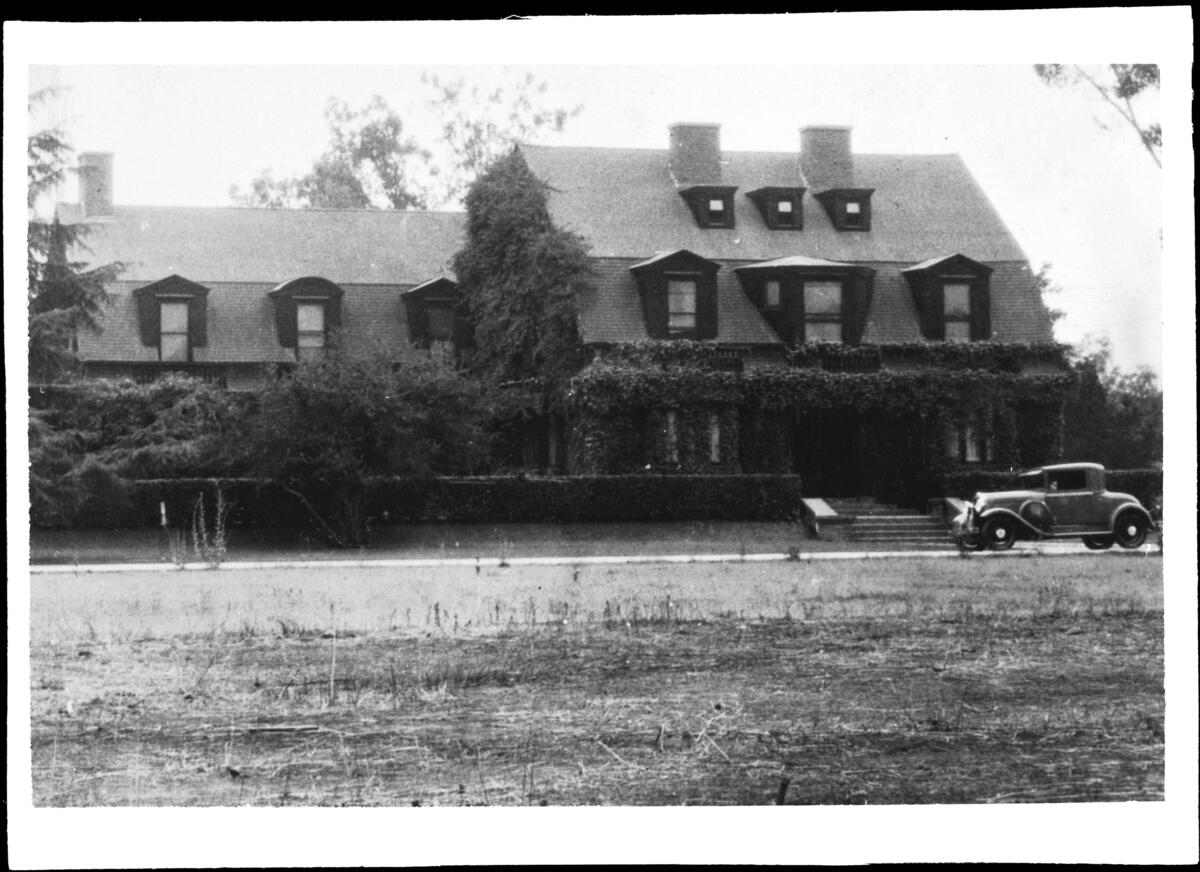
Bixby Ranch House, Los Cerritos, Long Beach, California; credited to both brothers

Coxhead moved with his older brother, Almeric William Sylvester Coxhead (1862–1928), to Los Angeles, California in 1886, where he established an independent practice, and soon secured commissions to design several Episcopal Churches in Southern California.

== San Francisco ==
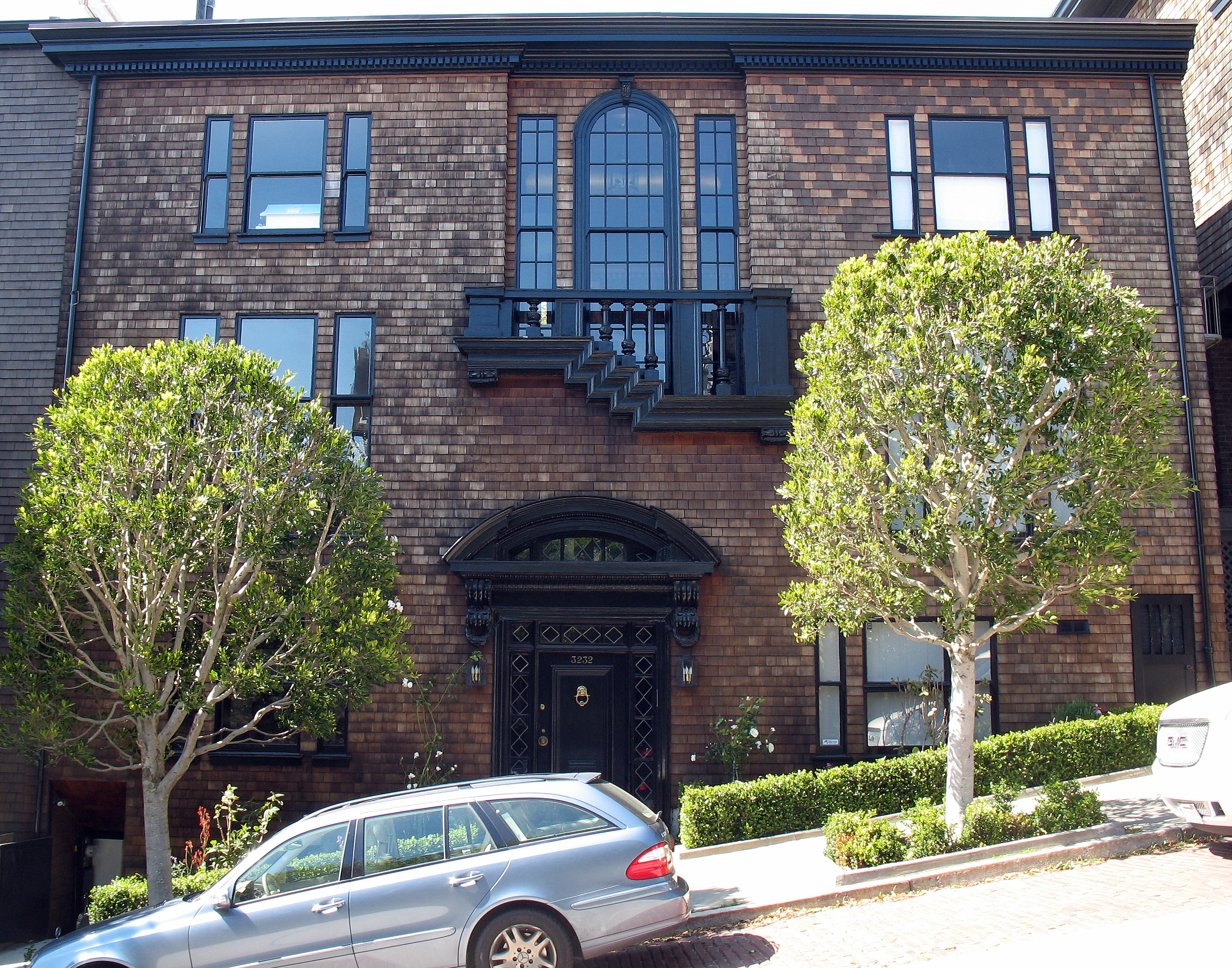
3232 Pacific Avenue in San Francisco, a townhouse designed by Coxhead in the New England vernacular style, in 2011

Coxhead's success with these projects led to commissions for several more churches in Northern California. He moved to San Francisco and opened the Coxhead and Coxhead office in 1890, with Almeric as his business partner. Seventeen Coxhead church buildings were constructed, of which eleven are extant. In 1893 his Episcopal Church client, Bishop William Kip, died and Coxhead started to concentrate on residential work. His residences include townhouses in San Francisco and large homes in Palo Alto, Alameda, and Berkeley.

From 1918 to 1919, Coxhead went to LeMans, France, to organize and direct the American Expeditionary Force's University School of Architecture, established by John Galen Howard, for members of the United States armed forces stationed in France. He was subsequently appointed Chief of the University Extension Field Work of the Fine Arts Department at the University School of Architecture in Beaune, France.

Coxhead returned to the United States and lived in Berkeley until his death in 1933. A collection of his work can be found in the Environmental Design Archives at the College of Environmental Design, University of California, Berkeley.

== Selected buildings ==
=== Residential ===
Residential by Coxhead
Year	Address	Name	Notes
1890	11 La Linda Drive, Los Cerritos, Long Beach, California	Bixby Ranch House	
	2421 Green Street, San Francisco, California	Coxhead House	This home was occupied by Coxhead, his wife and three children from 1893 to 1903.
1892	96 Park, San Anselmo, California		
c. 1892	486 Coombs Street, Napa, California	Churchill House (now Cedar Gables Inn)	
c. 1893	37 East Santa Inez Avenue, San Mateo, California	Ernest Coxhead House	This home was occupied by Coxhead as a country residence, from c. 1893 to 1924; followed by ownership by Arthur Upham Pope and Phyllis Ackerman, from 1924 to 1943. Listed on the National Register of Historic Places in San Mateo County, since April 6, 2000.
1893	2431 Ellsworth, Berkeley, California	Loy-Chamberlain House	
1893	2607 Hearst Avenue, Berkeley, California	Goldman School of Public Policy	
1893	2710 Scott, San Francisco, California		
1894	2940 Jackson, San Francisco, California		
1895	2600 Jackson, San Francisco, California		
1895	2511 Baker, San Francisco, California		
1896	3362 Clay, San Francisco, California		
1897	2700 Scott, San Francisco, California		
1899	2800 Pacific, San Francisco, California		
1900	3647 Washington, San Francisco, California		
1901	3232 & 3234 Pacific, San Francisco, California		
1902	2535 Laguna, San Francisco, California		
1903	1777 Le Roy Avenue, Berkeley, California	Allanoke Manor	Listed as a City of Berkeley Landmark in November, 1986.
1904	15 Canyon Road, Berkeley, California	Rieber House	
1906	160 Prospect Avenue, San Anselmo, California		
c. 1906	1 Canyon Road, Berkeley, California	Torrey House	
1907	351 Homer Avenue, Palo Alto, California	Williams House	
	76 Codornices Road, Berkeley, California		
1929	11 Southgate Drive, Woodside, California		

=== Commercial and public ===
Commercial and Public Buildings by Coxhead
Year	Name	Address	Notes
1906	Spanish–American War Soldier's Monument	Portland, Oregon	
1908	Pacific Telephone & Telegraph Building	San Francisco, California	
1918	Carnegie Library Golden Gate Valley	1801 Green Street, San Francisco, California	
	Prayer Book Cross	Golden Gate Park, San Francisco, California	

=== Churches ===
Churches by Coxhead
Year	Name	Address	Notes
1887	Church of the Epiphany	Los Angeles, California	
1888	Episcopal Church of the Ascension	Sierra Madre, California	
1889	Episcopal Church of the Messiah	Santa Ana, California	
1890	Holy Innocents Episcopal Church	San Francisco, California	
1891	Chapel of St. John the Evangelist	Monterey, California	
1891	St. John's Episcopal Church	Petaluma, California	
1891	St. Peter's Episcopal Church	Red Bluff, California	
1905	Sausalito Presbyterian Church	Sausalito, California	
1914	Christ Episcopal Church	Los Altos, California	Presently known as Foothills Congregational Church.
