= El Tecolote (restaurant) =

Restaurant in Camarillo, California, USA

Coordinates: 34°13′11″N 119°01′54″W

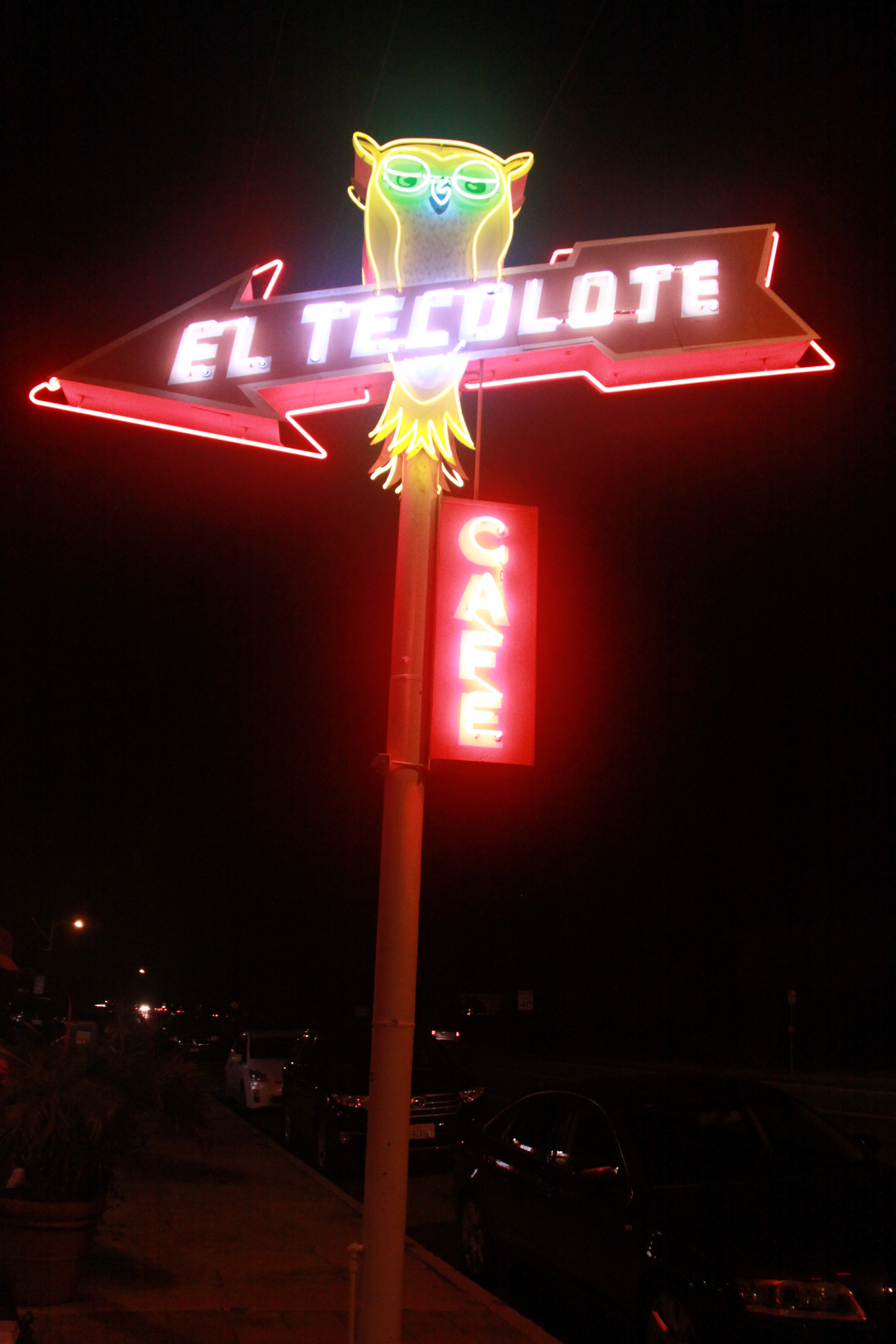
- The restaurant's neon roadside sign.
- Industry: Mexican food restaurant
- Founded: 1946
- Founder: Mike Loza
- Headquarters: 333 N. Lewis Road, Camarillo, California, U.S.
- Owner: Ben Guardado

El Tecolote is the oldest Mexican food restaurant in Camarillo, California. It was founded in 1946 and is located at 333 N. Lewis Road.

== History ==
El Tecolote ("The Owl" in Spanish) was founded in 1946 when Moorpark resident Mike Loza was job-searching after serving in the military during WWII. He decided to start his own business. The night before opening day, Loza could not sleep on account of local owls making noise; it was this event that made him decide to call his restaurant El Tecolote. A few years after opening, Loza moved the business from Moorpark to a small home in Camarillo; he relocated within Camarillo in 1952 when the business was so successful that it required a bigger space. Five years later, the restaurant expanded its location to include a large dining room for a total of 4,000 sq. ft. Loza sold the restaurant in 1984 to husband and wife David and Judy Jones. The restaurant came under the ownership of Jalisco, Mexico, native Benjamin "Ben" Guardado and his restaurant manager daughter Cindy Baltazar, in 2008.

== Gallery ==
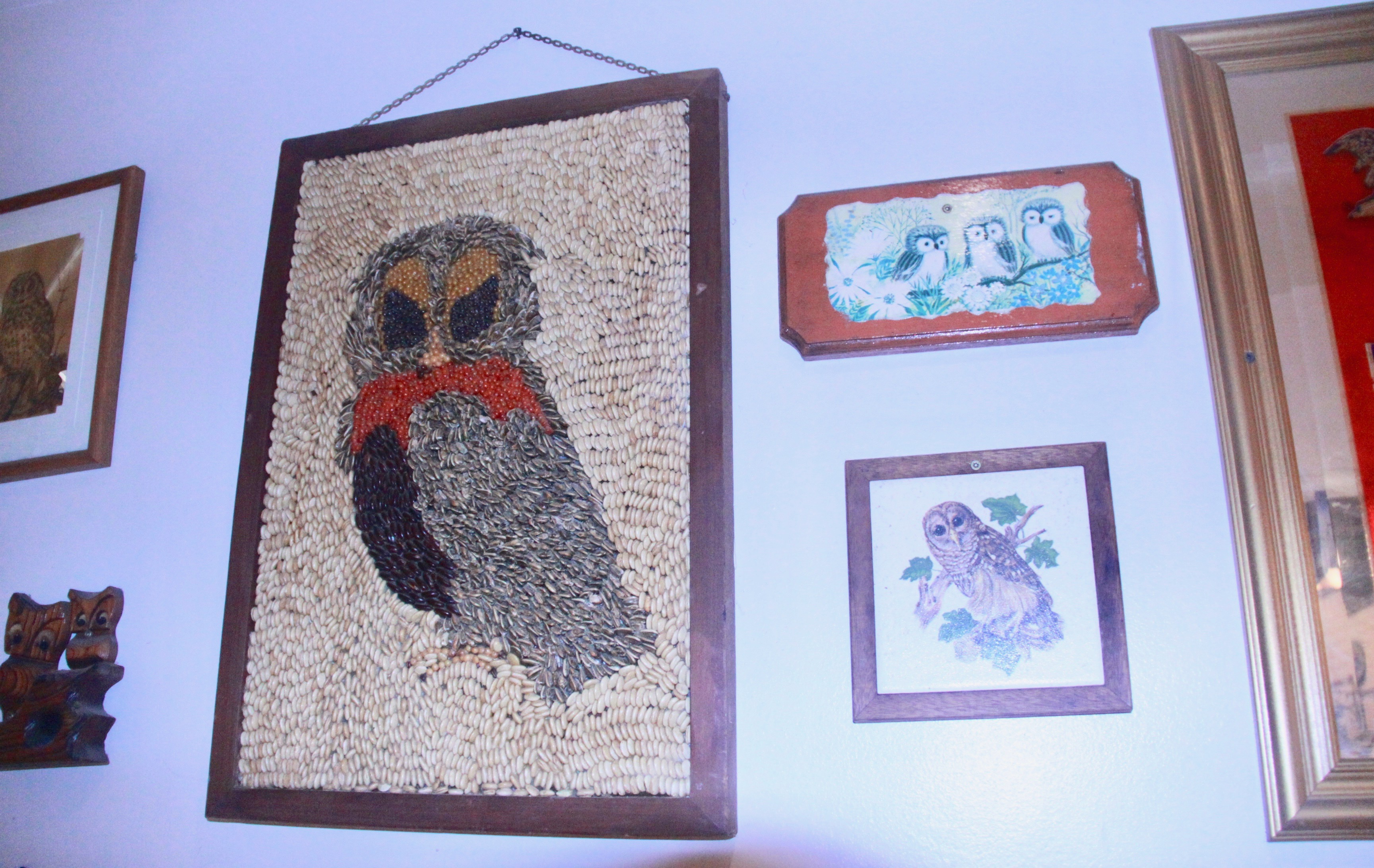
Some of the owl-themed decor

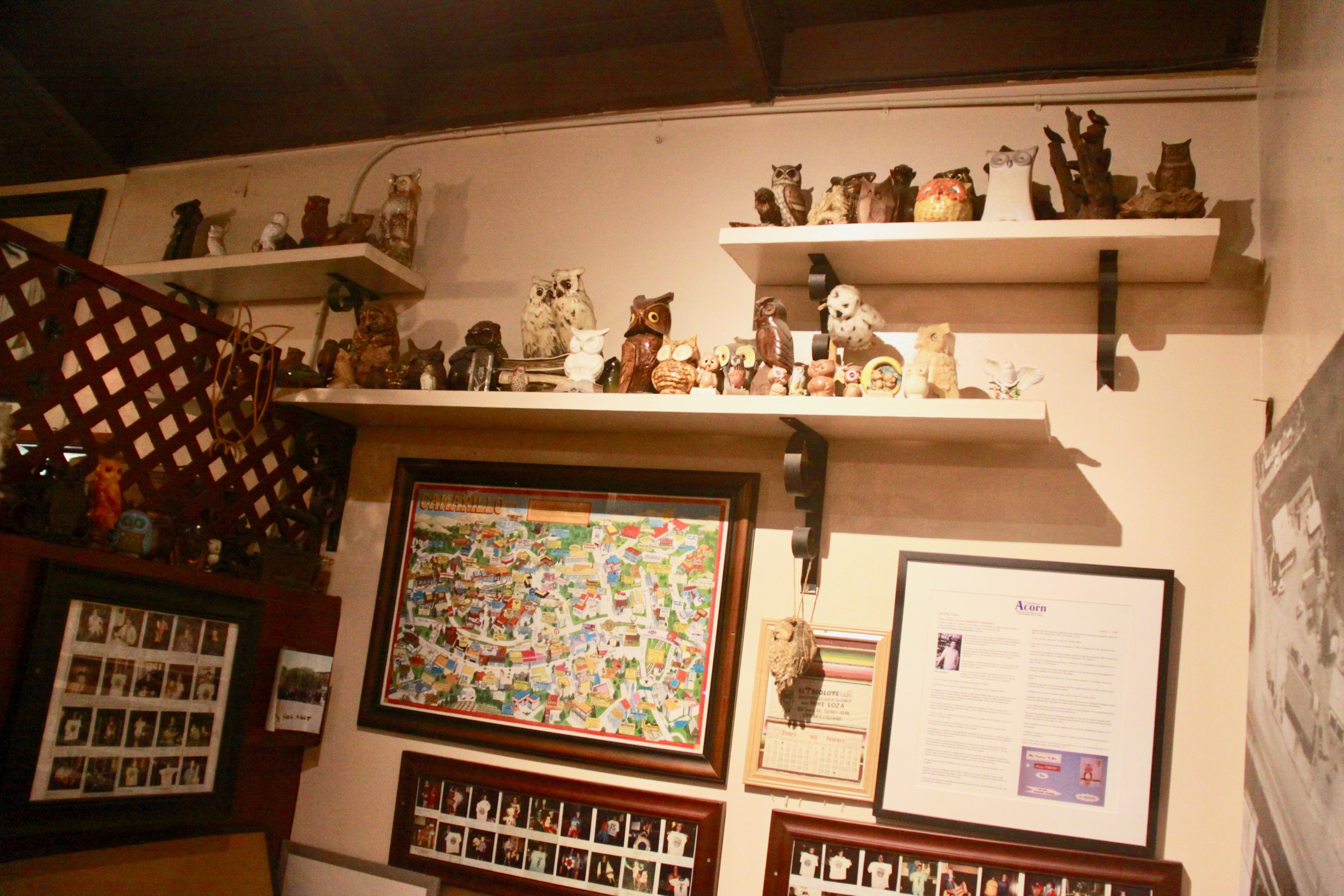
More of the owl-themed decor
