= Dance Mission Theater =

Coordinates: 37°45′08″N 122°25′08″W

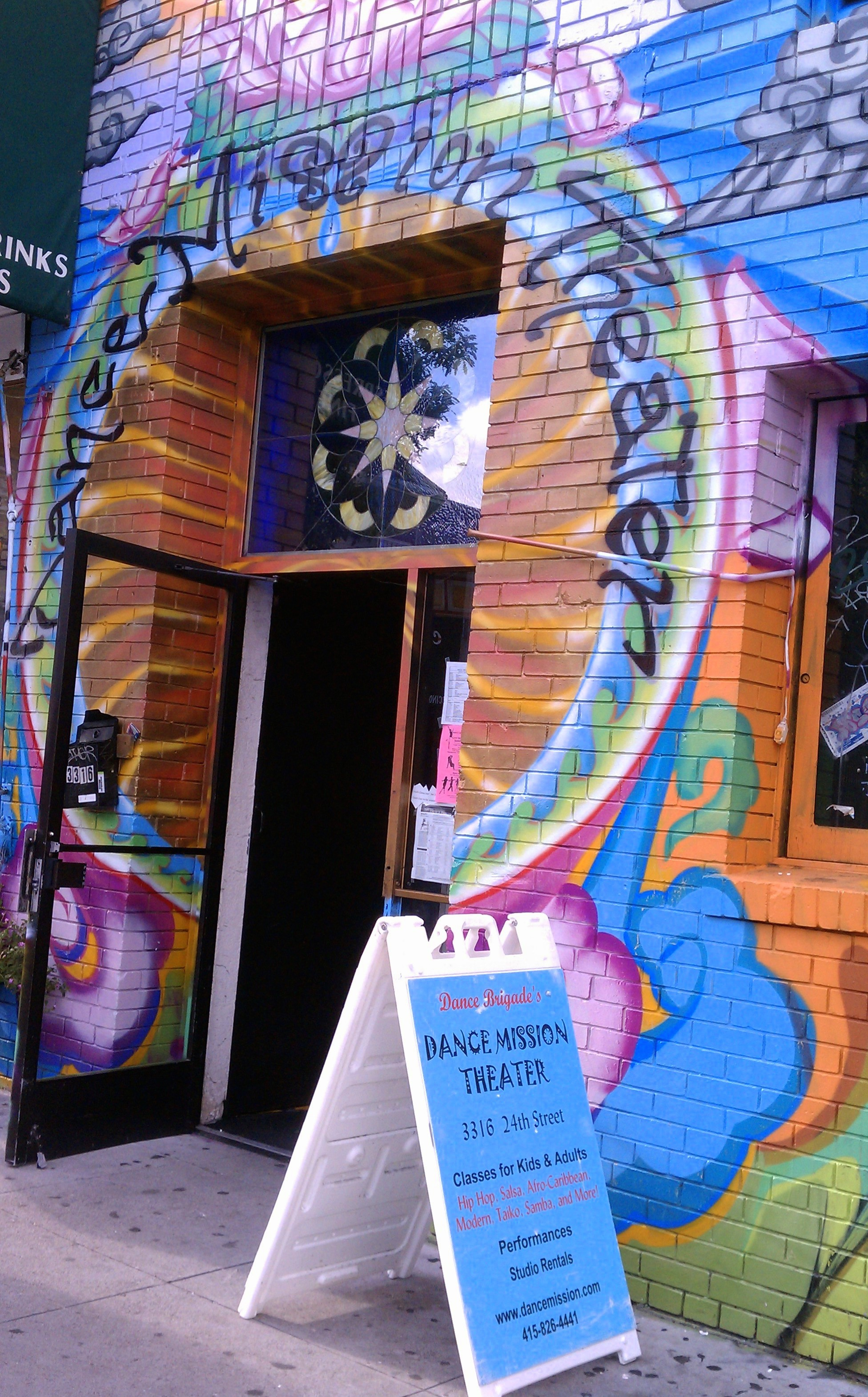
Dance Mission Theater at 24th Street and Mission Street.

Dance Mission Theater is a nonprofit performance venue and dance school located in the Mission District of San Francisco, California.

The theatre is operated by Dance Brigade, a female dance troupe with a focus on social change.

The theatre, known for its dance classes and performance art, has been ranked one of the best dance studios in San Francisco, offering around 50 classes and hosting roughly 1,500 students a week. The theatre offers approximately 48 weeks of programming per year.

The theatre has been located in its current space since 1998. In December 2014, the theatre announced that it might have to relocate after its landlord increased the theatre's rent. The theatre applied for assistance from the city Government of San Francisco.

As of late 2019, the organization planned to move, with two other local non-profits, to a new building at 18th and Mission.

== Notable performances ==
- August 2014: A performance in celebration of the book Can’t Stop Won’t Stop by Jeff Chang, with music, theater, and dance.
- November 2014: A percussion and dance show by the San Francisco Taiko Dojo.
- January–February 2015: "Dance In Revolt(ing) Times (D.I.R.T.)", with choreography on political themes.
- February 2016: The Black Choreographers Festival's annual event, "Next Wave Choreographers Showcase: New Voices/New Works."
