= El Tecolote (newspaper) =

- Type: Biweekly Newspaper
- Format: Broadsheet
- Owner: Acción Latina
- Founder: Juan Gonzales
- Publisher: Acción Latina
- Editor: Juan Gonzales
- Founded: August 24, 1970
- Language: English and Spanish
- Headquarters: 2958 24th Street; San Francisco, CA 94110; U.S.
- Circulation: 10,000
- Website: www.eltecolote.org

El Tecolote is a free bilingual, biweekly newspaper published by the nonprofit Acción Latina, and based in San Francisco that covers the Mission District and the surrounding area for the Latino community. It is the longest running bilingual newspaper that is printed in both English and Spanish in California. The newspaper also maintains a digital publication.

== History ==
El Tecolote can trace its roots to student activism from 1970. The newspaper began as a project in a La Raza Studies class at San Francisco State University that was created by Juan Gonzales, who wanted to try to channel more Latinos into journalism. The final project of this class was to create a bilingual newspaper in English and Spanish. The founder and first editor was Juan Gonzales. It was first printed and came out on August 24, 1970. It was named El Tecolote, Spanish for "The Owl." Its signature logo is the wise owl. In 1971 the newspaper moved out of the university and into the Mission District, becoming now part of the community. The paper is published and managed by Acción Latina, a nonprofit organization that promotes social activities that help empower the Latino community in San Francisco.

== Latino community newspaper ==
The newspaper is written primarily for the Latino community in the Mission District, capturing the everyday life of Latinos, and focusing on local and community affairs that affect them, and covering stories that are often ignored by the mainstream media. The paper writes original news stories, telling news from the Latino point of view. Promoting Latino civil rights, helping to create community identity, and writing stories about the culture of the Latino community are some of the goals of the paper. The paper is largely staffed by volunteers, and many college students and young journalists have written for the paper.

According to the paper's archivist Eva Martinez, the enduring success of El Tecolote has depended upon this original vision, including founder Juan Gonzales' capacity as a "skilled delegator" without "an ounce of ‘founder’s mentality’ in him. He truly stands behind his goal of creating a pipeline to the journalism profession and understands that the best way is by letting people take charge."

== Online, social media, and podcasts ==
The paper met the challenges of technological change in media by adapting to the digital age by adding a website and online publication. During this period, stories that came out in its printed newspaper were picked from the stories that came from its online publication. The paper developed social media presences on Facebook, Twitter/X, and Instagram.

On March 1, 2021, the publication launched its podcast, Radio Teco. The digital arm of the long-standing bilingual El Tecolote newspaper, the podcast dives into the rich and nuanced cultural history of Latinx communities across the San Francisco Bay Area and beyond. Episodes are released every Monday, with occasional bonus episodes released throughout the week. The podcast follows the launch of the bilingual Making of a Candidate/El Camindo del CandidatX podcast mini-series, which debuted on October 30, 2020.

Radio Teco ended publication in 2024.

== Coverage and distribution ==
The paper covers the Mission District. The paper distributes 7,000 free copies every two weeks throughout the Mission District and the East Bay by way of restaurants, libraries, clinics and social service centers.

== 2026 Staffing crisis ==
In mid-2026, seven members of El Tecolote's staff left amid allegations of editorial overreach by overseer non-profit Acción Latina's Executive Director Imelda Carrasco.

See also

- Institute for Nonprofit News (member)
- New America Media
