= Acción Latina =

Nonprofit organization in San Francisco

- Formation: 1970; 56 years ago
- Headquarters: 2958-24th Street, San Francisco, California, U.S.
- Coordinates: 37.752888°N 122.411308°W
- Website: accionlatina.org

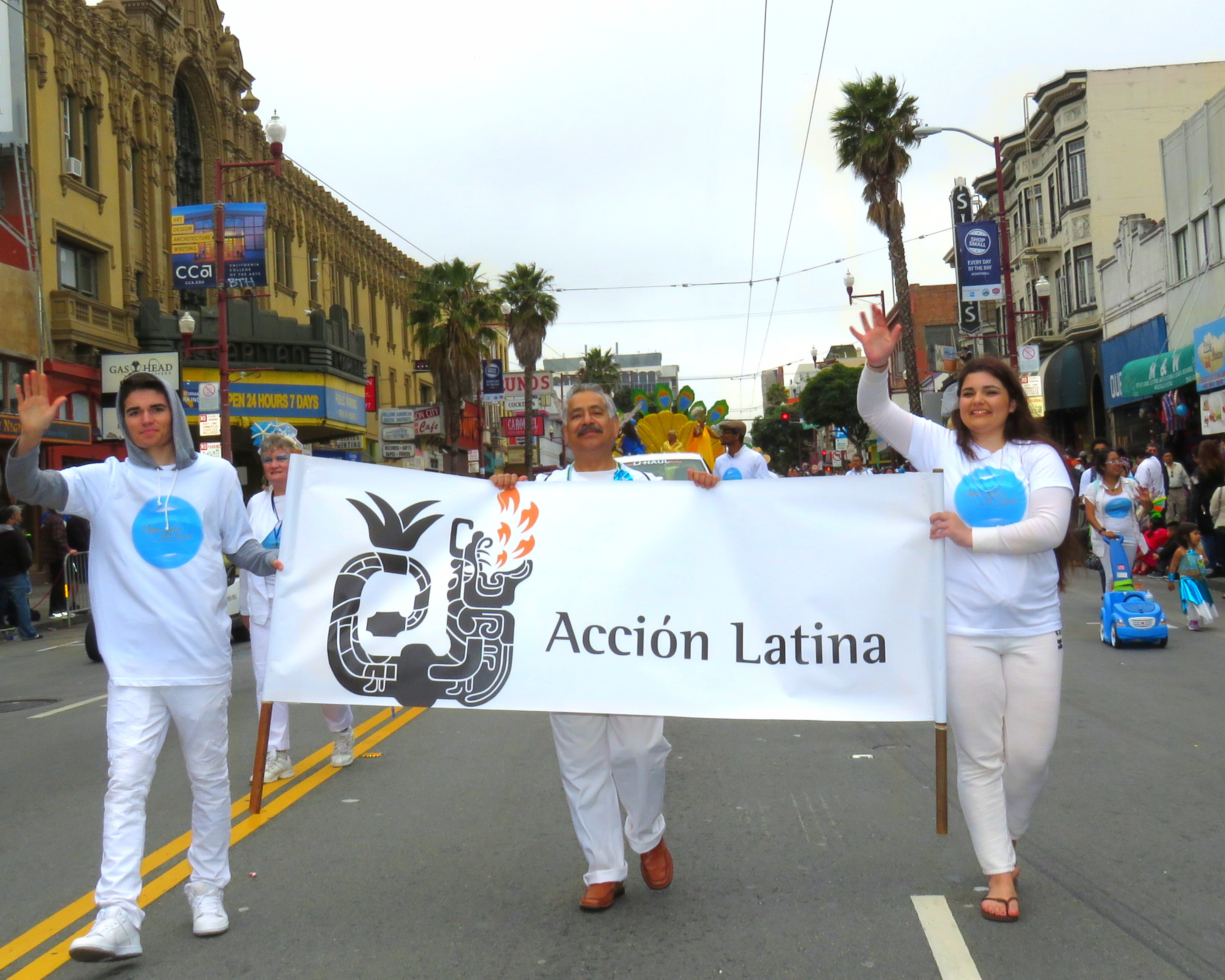
Acción Latina (2015) at Carnaval San Francisco

Acción Latina is a Latino cultural nonprofit organization founded in 1970, and located in the Mission District at 2958-24th Street, San Francisco, California. They publish a bilingual Spanish and English newspaper, El Tecolote, lead the Paseo Artístico community art stroll, and operate the Juan R. Fuentes Gallery. Acción Latina hosts diverse community driven visual, literary and performing arts events. They also manage the digital archives of El Tecolote, which span 45 years of publications.

The nonprofit was formed from a class group project at San Francisco State University in the 1970s.

== See also ==
- Chicano art movement
- Mexican Museum in San Francisco
- Mission Cultural Center for Latino Arts
