= Old St. Patrick's Church =

Old St. Patrick's Church may refer to:

- Old St. Patrick's Church (Chicago), listed on the NRHP in Illinois
- Old St. Patrick's Church (Gravois Mills, Missouri), listed on the NRHP in Missouri
- Old St. Patrick's Church (San Francisco) in San Francisco, California
- Old St. Patrick's Church (Wellington, Ohio), listed on the NRHP in Ohio
