= List of San Francisco Designated Landmarks =

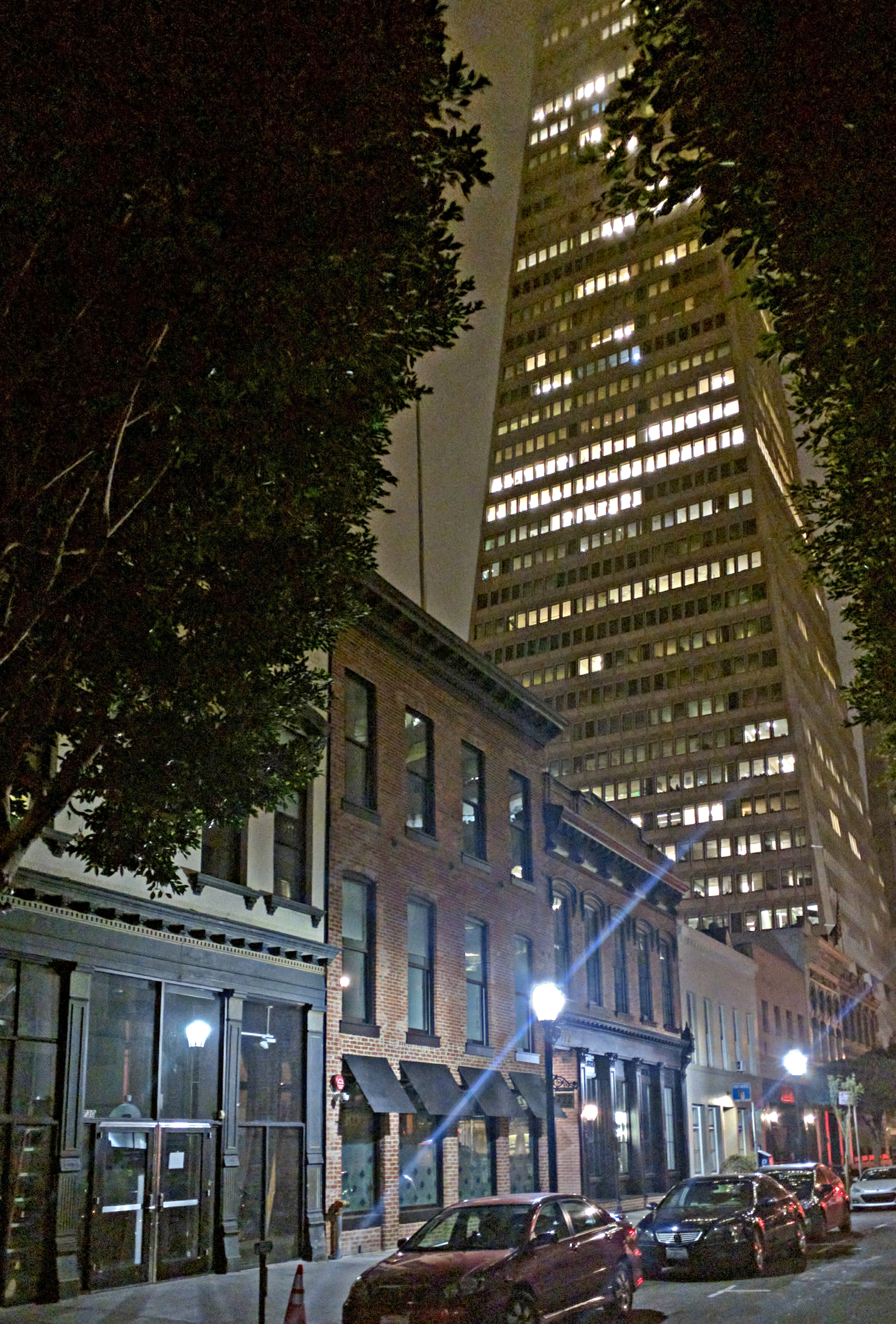
Three San Francisco Designated Landmarks along Montgomery Street: the Golden Era Building (left), the Genella Building (center), and the Belli Building (right). The Transamerica Pyramid is in the background.

This is a list of San Francisco Designated Landmarks. In 1967, the city of San Francisco, California, adopted Article 10 of the Planning Code, providing the city with the authority to designate and protect landmarks from inappropriate alterations. As of June 2024, the city had designated 318 structures or other properties as San Francisco Designated Landmarks. Many of the properties have also received recognition at the federal level by inclusion on the National Register of Historic Places or by designation as National Historic Landmarks.

== Color markings (highest noted listing) ==
National Historic Landmark
US National Register of Historic Places
California Historical Landmark
San Francisco Designated Landmark

== San Francisco Designated Landmarks ==
#	Name	Image	Address	Date designated	Description	Type
1	Mission Dolores		320 Dolores Street	April 11, 1968	37.7642°N 122.4266°W	NRHP
2	Old Saint Mary's Cathedral		660 California Street	April 11, 1968	37.79265°N 122.40575°W	CHISL
3	Bank of California Building		400 California Street	September 3, 1968	37.7932°N 122.4016°W; Built in 1908, designed by Walter Danforth Bliss and William Baker Faville	SFDL
4	Saint Patrick's Church		756 Mission Street	September 3, 1968	37.785588°N 122.403508°W	SFDL
5	Saint Francis of Assisi Church		610 Vallejo Street	September 3, 1968	37.7988°N 122.4077°W	SFDL
6	Old St. Patrick's Church		1820 Eddy Street	September 3, 1968	37.7808°N 122.4378°W	SFDL
7	Audiffred Building		1–21 Mission Street	October 13, 1968	37.7934°N 122.3926°W; Commercial structure built in 1889 in Parisian style	NRHP
8	Bayview Opera House		1601 Newcomb Avenue	December 8, 1968	37.735299°N 122.390026°W; Also known as Bayview Opera House; built in 1888	NRHP
9	Belli Building		722 Montgomery Street	February 3, 1969	37.7961°N 122.4033°W; Formerly owned by Melvin Belli	SFDL
10	Genella Building		728 Montgomery Street	February 3, 1969	37.7961°N 122.4033°W	SFDL
11	Hotaling Stables Building		32–42 Hotaling Place	February 3, 1969	37.796054°N 73.968844°W	SFDL
12	Hotaling Building		451 Jackson Street	February 3, 1969	37.7964°N 122.4028°W	SFDL
13	Hotaling Annex East		445 Jackson Street	February 3, 1969	37.7964°N 122.4028°E	SFDL
14	Medico-Dental Building		441 Jackson Street	February 3, 1969	37.7965°N 122.4030°E	SFDL
15	Ghirardelli Building		415-431 Jackson Street	February 3, 1969	37.7963°N 122.4025°E	SFDL
16	Ghirardelli Annex-Jackson Street		407 Jackson Street	February 3, 1969	37.79648°N 122.40208°E	SFDL
17	McElroy Octagon House		2645 Gough Street	February 3, 1969	37.7978°N 122.4274°W Also known as the Colonial Dames Octagon House	NRHP
18	Palace Hotel		2 New Montgomery Street and 633 Market Street	March 9, 1969	37.788411°N 122.40205°W	SFDL
19	Golden Era Building		732 Montgomery Street	March 9, 1969	37.796212°N 122.403212°E	SFDL
20	Hotaling Annex West		463–473 Jackson Street	March 9, 1969	37.796424°N 122.403117°E	SFDL
21	San Francisco City Hall		1 Dr. Carlton B. Goodlett Place	March 13, 1970	37.77919°N 122.41914°W; Block bounded by Polk and McAllister Streets, Van Ness Avenue and Grove Street	NHL
22	Solari Building (Larco's Building)		470 Jackson Street	March 16, 1970	37.7963°N 122.4035°E	SFDL
23	Solari Building		472 Jackson Street	March 16, 1970	37.7965°N 122.4031°W; Also known as the Old French Consulate	SFDL
24	Yeon Building		432 Jackson Street	March 16, 1970	37.796552°N 122.402534°E	SFDL
25	Moulinie Building		458–60 Jackson Street	March 16, 1970		SFDL
26	Bank of Lucas, Turner & Co.		800–804 Montgomery Street	March 16, 1970		SFDL
27	Grogan-Lent-Atherton Building		400 Jackson Street	March 16, 1970		SFDL
28	Old Holy Virgin Russian Orthodox Cathedral		858–864 Fulton Street	May 3, 1970	37.77796°N 122.430918°W	SFDL
29	Old Fire House, Engine 22		1348 10th Avenue	May 3, 1970		SFDL
30	Ghirardelli Square		Block bounded by North Point, Larkin, Beach, and Polk Streets	May 3, 1970	37.805703°N 122.421794°W	NRHP
31	Burr Mansion		1772 Vallejo Street	May 3, 1970		SFDL
32	Abner Phelps House		1111 Oak Street	May 31, 1970	37.7728°N 122.4381°W	NRHP
33	Columbus Tower		916–920 Kearny Street	June 13, 1970	37.7964°N 122.4049°W; Completed in 1907, and survived the 1906 earthquake and fire. Also known as the Sentinel Building	SFDL
34	San Francisco Mint		608 Commercial Street	June 14, 1970	37°47′39.3″N 122°24′12.7″W	CHISL
35	Stadtmuller House		819 Eddy Street	December 5, 1970	37.782793°N 122.421719°W	NRHP
36	Feusier Octagon House		1067 Green Street	December 5, 1970	37.7983°N 122.4167°W	NRHP
37	Hallidie Building		130 Sutter Street	April 4, 1971	37.7901°N 122.403°W	NRHP
38	Bourn Mansion		2550 Webster Street	April 4, 1971		SFDL
39	St. Francis Lutheran Church		152 Church Street	July 10, 1971		SFDL
40	First Unitarian Church		Block bounded by Franklin Street, Geary Boulevard, and Starr King Way	July 10, 1971		SFDL
41	Saint Mark's Evangelical Lutheran Church		1135 O'Farrell Street (vacated portion)	July 10, 1971		SFDL
42	Dennis T. Sullivan Memorial Fire Chief's Home		870 Bush Street	October 10, 1971		SFDL
43	Cable Car Barn and Power House		1201 Mason Street	October 10, 1971	37.794675°N 122.411396°W Washington and Mason Streets, northwest corner; now called the San Francisco Cable Car Museum	SFDL
44	Donaldina Cameron House		920 Sacramento Street	October 10, 1971	37.793467°N 122.408552°W Formerly the Occidental Board Presbyterian Mission House; residence of Donaldina Cameron	SFDL
45	Leale House		2475 Pacific Avenue	April 2, 1972		SFDL
46	House of the Flag		1652–1656 Taylor Street	May 12, 1972		SFDL
47	Nightingale House		201 Buchanan Street	October 1, 1972	37.77177°N 122.42718°W Built in 1908, designed by Walter Danforth Bliss and William Baker Faville	SFDL
48	Charles Dietle House		294 Page Street	October 1, 1972		SFDL
49	Sherman House		2160 Green Street	October 18, 1972		SFDL
50	Conservatory of Flowers		100 John F. Kennedy Memorial Drive	December 4, 1972	37.7726°N 122.4602°W inside Golden Gate Park	NRHP
51	Casebolt House		2727 Pierce Street	March 5, 1973		SFDL
52	Fugazi Bank Building		4 Columbus Avenue	March 5, 1973		SFDL
53	Wormser-Coleman House		1834 California Street	June 1, 1973		SFDL
54	Edward Coleman House		1701 Franklin Street	July 6, 1973		SFDL
55	Lilienthal-Orville Pratt House		1818–1824 California Street	July 6, 1973		SFDL
56	Roos House		3500 Jackson Street	August 6, 1973		NRHP
57	Talbot–Dutton House		1782 Pacific Avenue	November 2, 1973		SFDL
58	Merryvale Antiques		3640 Buchanan Street	February 4, 1974		SFDL
59	San Francisco Maritime National Historical Park		680 Beach Street	February 4, 1974	37.8069°N 122.4201°W	NRHP
60	Albion Brewery		881 Innes Avenue	April 5, 1974		SFDL
61	Sylvester House		1556 Revere Avenue	April 5, 1974		SFDL
62	Mish House		1153 Oak Street	July 6, 1974	37.7729°N 122.4383°W	NRHP
63	Quinn House		1562 McKinnon Avenue	July 6, 1974		SFDL
64	James C. Flood Mansion		1000 California Street	August 2, 1974	37.792°N 122.4114°W; Now the Pacific Union Club	NHL
65	Trinity Church		1668 Bush Street	October 5, 1974		SFDL
66	Stanyan House		2006 Bush Street	January 4, 1975		SFDL
67	Tanforan Cottage #1		214 Dolores Street	January 4, 1975		SFDL
68	Tanforan Cottage #2		220 Dolores Street	January 4, 1975		SFDL
69	Haas-Lilienthal House		2007 Franklin Street	January 4, 1975	37.7933°N 122.4248°W	NRHP
70	Atherton House		1990 California Street	February 19, 1975		SFDL
71	Goodman Building		1117 Geary Boulevard	February 28, 1975	37.7855°N 122.4222°W	NRHP
72	V.C. Morris Building		140 Maiden Lane	August 7, 1975		SFDL
73	Lotta's Fountain		Pedestrian Island, at Intersection of Market, Geary and Kearny Streets	July 19, 1975	37.7879°N 122.4033°W	NRHP
74	Frank M. Stone House		1348 South Van Ness Avenue	July 19, 1975		SFDL
75	Whittier Mansion		2090 Jackson Street	November 8, 1975	37.7933°N 122.4295°W; Now the California Historical Society	NRHP
76	Mills Building and Tower		220 Montgomery Street and 220 Bush Street	November 8, 1975	37.7912°N 122.4018°W	NRHP
77	Samuels Clock		Sidewalk in front 856 Market Street	December 7, 1975		SFDL
78	Sunnyside Conservatory		236 Monterey Boulevard	December 7, 1975		SFDL
79	Miller-Joost House		3224 Market Street	December 7, 1975		SFDL
80	Alfred E. Clarke Mansion		250 Douglas Street	December 7, 1975	37.75961°N 122.43953°W	SFDL
81	Bush Street Temple		1881 Bush Street	April 18, 1976		SFDL
82	Geary Theater		415 Geary Street	July 11, 1976	37.787°N 122.4103°W home of the American Conservatory Theater	NRHP
83	St. John's Presbyterian Church		25 Lake Street	September 12, 1976	37.7866°N 122.4586°W	NRHP
84	San Francisco War Memorial and Performing Arts Center		401 Van Ness Avenue	January 9, 1977	Van Ness Avenue, between Grove and McAllister Streets	NHL
85	San Francisco Art Institute		800 Chestnut Street	July 9, 1977	37.803456°N 122.417144°W	SFDL
86	Potrero Hill Neighborhood House		953 DeHaro Street	July 9, 1977		SFDL
87	Jessie Street Substation		220 Jessie Street	July 9, 1977	37.7861°N 122.4035°W home of the Contemporary Jewish Museum	NRHP
88	Palace of Fine Arts		3301 Lyon Street	July 9, 1977	37.8029°N 122.4484°W	NRHP
89	Old Firehouse, Engine Company No. 2 and Truck No. 6		1152 Oak Street	July 9, 1977	37.7908°N 122.4051°W	NRHP
90	San Francisco Ferry Building		1 Ferry Building	July 9, 1977	37.7954°N 122.3936°W on the Embarcadero, at the foot of Market Street	NRHP
91	Gibb-Sanborn Warehouse		855 Front Street and 101 Vallejo Street	July 9, 1977	37.7995°N 122.4002°W; Also known as the Trinidad Bean and Elevator Company	NRHP
92	Gibb-Sanborn Warehouse (Pelican Paper)		901 Front Street	July 9, 1977		SFDL
93	Old Firehouse, Engine Company No. 23		3022 Washington Street	July 9, 1977		SFDL
94	Orpheum Theatre		1192 Market Street	July 9, 1977	37.779081°N 122.414708°W	SFDL
95	Koshland House		3800 Washington Street	July 9, 1977	37.789°N 122.4559°W	NRHP
96	Francis Scott Key Monument		Golden Gate Park, East End of Music Concourse	July 9, 1977	37.77064°N 122.46749°W	SFDL
97	Atkinson House		1032 Broadway	July 17, 1977		SFDL
98	Ortman-Shumate House		1901 Scott Street	August 13, 1977		SFDL
99	Schoenstein Organ		3101 20th Street	August 13, 1977		SFDL
100	Castro Theatre		429 Castro Street	September 3, 1977	37.7620°N 122.435°W	SFDL
101	Oriental Warehouse	Oriental Warehouse	650 Delancey Street	October 8, 1977		SFDL
102	Italian Swiss Colony Building		1265 Battery Street	January 8, 1978	At Greenwich Street	SFDL
103	Calvary Presbyterian Church		2501 Fillmore Street	January 10, 1978	37.7927°N 122.4347°W	NRHP
104	Independent Wood Company Building		1105 Battery Street	April 23, 1979	At Union Street	SFDL
105	Market Street Railway Substation		1190 Fillmore Street	April 23, 1979	37.7804°N 122.4319°W at Turk Street	SFDL
106	Chambord Apartments		1298 Sacramento Street	April 23, 1979	37.7925°N 122.4142°W	NRHP
107	Rincon Annex		101–199 Mission Street	February 10, 1980	37.7928°N 122.3934°W	NRHP
108	National Guard Armory and Arsenal		1800 Mission Street	February 10, 1980	37.767778°N 122.420556°W	NRHP
109	Borel & Co.		440 Montgomery Street	April 6, 1980		SFDL
110	Italian American Bank		460 Montgomery Street	April 6, 1980		NHL
111	Family Service Agency		1010 Gough Street	October 12, 1980		SFDL
112	Rothschild House		964 Eddy Street	October 5, 1980		SFDL
113	San Francisco Mining Exchange		350 Bush Street	October 5, 1980		SFDL
114	Belt Railroad Engine House and Sandhouse		1500 Sansome Street	October 5, 1980	Block bounded by Lombard, Sansome, and the Embarcadero	NRHP
115	Health Sciences Library		2395 Sacramento Street	October 5, 1980		SFDL
116	St. Paulus Lutheran Church		999 Eddy Street		At Gough Street; Rescinded by Ord. 379–396	SFDL
117	Hammersmith Building		301–303 Sutter Street	October 5, 1980		SFDL
118	B'nai David Synagogue		3535 19th Street	October 5, 1980		SFDL
119	Chambers Mansion		2220 Sacramento Street	October 5, 1980		SFDL
120	St. Joseph's Church		1401 Howard Street	October 5, 1980		NRHP
121	Julius' Castle		302–304 Greenwich Street	October 5, 1980		SFDL
122	Chinese Historical Society of America		940 Powell Street and 965 Clay Street	January 4, 1981		SFDL
123	John McMullen House		827 Guerrero Street	January 4, 1981	37.7579°N 122.4232°W	NRHP
124	Sharon Building		300 Bowling Green Drive	January 4, 1981	37.7882°N 122.4012°W Inside of Golden Gate Park	SFDL
125	Havens Mansion and Carriage House		1381 South Van Ness Avenue	April 11, 1981	37.751188°N 122.415965°W	SFDL
126	Edward Bransten House		1735 Franklin Street	June 7, 1981		SFDL
127	Old Spaghetti Factory Cafe		478 Green Street	June 7, 1981		SFDL
128	Clunie House		301 Lyon Street	June 7, 1981	Residence of Thomas Jefferson Clunie	SFDL
129	Bauer & Schweitzer Malting Company		550 Chestnut Street	July 5, 1981		SFDL
130	Hibernia Bank		1 Jones Street	August 2, 1981		SFDL
131	Union Trust Branch		744 Market Street	August 2, 1981		SFDL
132	Savings Union Bank		1 Grant Avenue	August 2, 1981		SFDL
133	Axford House		1190 Noe Street	August 2, 1981		SFDL
134	Mechanics' Institute, San Francisco		57–65 Post Street	September 6, 1981	37.788844°N 122.403042°W	SFDL
135	William Westerfeld House		1198 Fulton Street	December 6, 1981	37.7772°N 122.4364°W	NRHP
136	Kershaw House		845 Guerrero Street	December 6, 1981		SFDL
137	Notre Dame des Victoires School		351 Dolores Street	December 6, 1981	37.7907°N 122.4065°W	SFDL
138	Irving M. Scott School		1060 Tennessee Street	December 6, 1981		SFDL
139	St. Charles School		3250 18th Street	December 6, 1981		SFDL
140	High School of Commerce		135 Van Ness Avenue	December 6, 1981		SFDL
141	Home Telephone Company		333 Grant Avenue	December 6, 1981		SFDL
142	PG&E Substation J		569 Commercial Street	December 6, 1981	Pacific Gas and Electric Company	NRHP
143	Fire Department Old Station No. 2		466 Bush Street	December 6, 1981	San Francisco Fire Department	NRHP
144	Hoffman Grill		619 Market Street	December 6, 1981		SFDL
145	Buich Building		240 California Street	December 6, 1981		SFDL
146	Jack's Restaurant		615 Sacramento Street	December 6, 1981		SFDL
147	Dutch Windmill		Golden Gate Park	December 6, 1981	37.77044°N 122.50941°W	SFDL
148	Kerrigan House-Ruth Cravath Stoneyard and Studio		893 Wisconsin Street	June 5, 1982		SFDL
149	Edwin Klockars' Blacksmith Shop		443 Folsom Street	June 12, 1982		SFDL
150	Sheet Metal Workers Union Hall		224–226 Guerrero Street	June 12, 1982		SFDL
151	Archbishop's Mansion		1000 Fulton Street	June 12, 1982		SFDL
152	Don Lee Building		1000 Van Ness Avenue	July 10, 1982		SFDL
153	Earle C. Anthony Packard Showroom		901 Van Ness Avenue	July 10, 1982		SFDL
154	Flood Building		870–898 Market Street	July 10, 1982	37.7849°N 122.4074°W	SFDL
155	Flatiron Building		540–548 Market Street	July 10, 1982		SFDL
156	Phelan Building		760–784 Market Street	July 10, 1982		SFDL
157	Hills Bros. Coffee Plant		2 Harrison Street	November 7, 1982	Hills Bros. Coffee	SFDL
158	Old Federal Reserve Bank Building		400 Sansome Street	January 7, 1983	37.7943°N 122.4011°W	NRHP
159	Gaylord Hotel		620 Jones Street	April 10, 1983		SFDL
160	Royal Insurance Building		201 Sansome Street	April 10, 1983		SFDL
161	Kohl Building		400 Montgomery Street	April 10, 1983	Also known as the Alvinza Hayward Building.	SFDL
162	Hobart Building		582–592 Market Street	July 9, 1983		SFDL
163	Sharon Building		39–63 Montgomery Street	July 9, 1983		SFDL
164	McMorry-Lagen House		188–198 Haight Street	November 6, 1983		SFDL
165	Coit Tower		1 Telegraph Hill Boulevard	January 1, 1984	37.8024°N 122.4058°W	NRHP
166	Trinity Presbyterian Church		3261 23rd Street	March 30, 1984		NRHP
167	Metropolitan Life Building		600 Stockton Street	June 3, 1984		SFDL
168	William Vale House		2226 California Street	June 3, 1984		SFDL
169	Campfire Golden Gate Council Headquarters		325 Arguello Boulevard	June 30, 1984		SFDL
170	Grace Cathedral		1051 Taylor Street	August 5, 1984		SFDL
171	Refugee Shack		1227 24th Avenue	August 12, 1984		SFDL
172	St. Boniface Church and Rectory		133 Golden Gate Avenue	October 7, 1984		SFDL
173	Notre Dame des Victoires Church and Rectory		564–566 Bush Street	October 7, 1984		SFDL
174	California Hall		625 Polk Street	October 7, 1984		SFDL
175	McLaren Lodge		501 Stanyan Street	November 4, 1984	Within Golden Gate Park, and part of San Francisco Recreation & Parks Department	SFDL
176	Cadillac Hotel		366–394 Eddy Street	January 6, 1985		SFDL
177	First Congregational Church		432 Mason Street	March 1, 1985		SFDL
178	Mission Turn Hall		3543 18th Street	March 1, 1985		SFDL
179	Beach Chalet		100 Great Highway	February 22, 1985		NRHP
180	S.F.& S.M. Railway Co. Office Building		2301 San Jose Avenue	January 26, 1986	Market Street Railway (transit operator)	NRHP
181	Lawn Bowling Clubhouse and Greens		320 Bowling Green Drive	September 7, 1986	Golden Gate Park	SFDL
182	Theodore Green Apothecary		500–502 Divisadero Street	September 14, 1986		SFDL
183	Crown Zellerbach Building		1 Bush Street and 523 Market Street	May 17, 1987	37.7908°N 122.4°W now One Bush Plaza	SFDL
184	Mark Hopkins Hotel		999 California Street	May 17, 1987	37.791558°N 122.410364°W	SFDL
185	Fairmont Hotel		950 Mason Street	June 13, 1987	37.7924°N 122.4106°W	NRHP
186	David Lewis House		4143 23rd Street	February 14, 1988		SFDL
187	Engine Co. No. 37, Truck Co. No. 9		2501 25th Street	March 19, 1988		SFDL
188	Engine Co. No. 8, Truck Co. No. 4		1648 Pacific Avenue	March 19, 1988		SFDL
189	Frank G. Edwards House		1366 Guerrero Street	December 17, 1988	37.7493°N 122.4228°W	NRHP
190	Charles L. Hinkel House and Carriage House		280 Divisadero Street	December 17, 1988		SFDL
191	Oakley Residence and Flats		200–202 Fair Oaks Street	March 8, 1989		SFDL
192	Southern Pacific Hospital		1400 Fell Street and 1509, 1555, 1599 Hayes Street	March 8, 1989	Built in 1908	NRHP
193	Baker and Hamilton Building		700–768 7th Street	October 18, 1989		SFDL
194	Lefty O'Doul Bridge		3rd Street over Mission Channel at China Basin	October 18, 1989	37.7767°N 122.39°W	SFDL
195	Alcazar Theater		650 Geary Street	October 18, 1989	37.78666°N 122.41399°W	SFDL
196	Alfred G. Hanson Residence		126 27th Avenue	December 22, 1989		SFDL
197	Spreckels Mansion		2080 Washington Street	June 9, 1990		SFDL
198	Richard E. Queen House		2212 Sacramento Street	August 31, 1990		SFDL
199	Jackson Brewery Complex		1475, 1477, 1479, 1479A, 1489 Folsom Street and 301–05, 315–319, 333 11th Street	January 5, 1991		NRHP
200	Path of Gold Light Standards		1–2490 Market Street	July 26, 1991		SFDL
201	Park Emergency Hospital		811 Stanyan Street	November 2, 1991	Kezar Corner, Golden Gate Park	SFDL
202	Golden Gate Commandery of Knights Templar (Macedonia Missionary Baptist Church)		2135 Sutter Street	January 22, 1993		SFDL
203	George Gibbs Residence and caretaker's cottage		2620–2624 Jackson Street	September 26, 1993		SFDL
204	Our Lady of Guadalupe Church		906 Broadway	November 14, 1993	37.797468°N 122.412394°W	SFDL
205	Balboa High School		1000 Cayuga Avenue	February 19, 1995	37.721828°N 122.441072°W	SFDL
206	Howard and 26th Street Cottages		3274–3294 26th Street, 1487–1499 South Van Ness Avenue and 84–96 Virgil Street	January 22, 1994		SFDL
207	Ellinwood Residence		2799 Pacific Avenue and 2498 Divisadero Street	January 22, 1994		SFDL
208	McCormick House		4040 17th Street	January 22, 2000		SFDL
209	Odd Fellows Columbarium		1 Loraine Court	March 3, 1996	37.780612°N 122.45707°W	SFDL
210	Murphy Windmill and Millwright's Cottage		2100 Martin Luther King, Jr. Drive	July 2, 2000	West End of Golden Gate Park	SFDL
211	Madame C.J. Walker Home for Girls and Women		2066 Pine Street	December 12, 1999	37.788631°N 122.429895°W	SFDL
212	Columbia Savings Bank Building		700 Montgomery Street	October 8, 2000		SFDL
213	Joseph Leonard/Cecil F. Poole House		90 Cedro Avenue	July 2, 2000		SFDL
214	El Capitan Theatre and Hotel		2353 Mission Street	March 3, 1996		SFDL
215	Victoria Theatre		2961 16th Street	March 3, 1996	Formerly Brown's Opera House	SFDL
216	Milo Hoadley Residence		2908–2910 Bush Street	June 21, 1996		SFDL
217	Alhambra Theater		2320–2336 Polk Street	March 3, 1996	37.79831°N 122.4221°W	SFDL
218	North End Police Station and Garage		2475 Greenwich Street	May 24, 1996		SFDL
219	Mount Davidson Monument		At the top of Mount Davidson	January 16, 1997	37.7386°N 122.4547°W	SFDL
220	Former Engine House No. 31		1088 Green Street	April 8, 1998	37.7986°N 122.417°W	NRHP
221	Former Shriners Hospital		1701 19th Avenue	April 8, 1998		SFDL
222	Golden Gate Bridge		At the Presidio, U.S. Highway 101 and California Highway 1	May 21, 1999	37.819722°N 122.478611°W	CHISL
223	Carmel Fallon Building		1800 Market Street	November 8, 1998	37.77175°N 122.42405°W currently houses the San Francisco LGBT Community Center	SFDL
224	Schubert Hall		2099 Pacific Avenue	May 21, 1999		SFDL
225	Fireboat House		Pier 221/2, the Embarcadero	April 16, 1999		SFDL
226	Washington Square		600 Columbus Avenue	January 22, 1999	37.800868°N 122.410001°W bound by Union, Filbert, and Stockton Streets	SFDL
227	The Castro Camera and the Harvey Milk Residence		573–575 Castro Street	July 2, 2000		SFDL
228	City Lights Bookstore		261–271 Columbus Avenue	August 26, 2001	37.797628°N 122.406575°W	SFDL
229	Garcia and Maggini Warehouse	Garcia and Maggini Warehouse	128 King Street	June 23, 2002		SFDL
231	Laguna Honda Station / Forest Hill Station		390 Laguna Honda Boulevard	September 23, 2004	37.74803°N 122.45914°W now known as Forest Hill station (Muni Metro)	SFDL
232	Filbert Street Cottages (Bush Cottages and the School of Basic Design and Color)		1338 Filbert Street	April 3, 2003		SFDL
233	Golden Triangle Light Standards		Along the streets bounded by Market, and Sutter Streets	May 23, 2003		SFDL
234	Carnegie Mission Branch Library		300 Bartlett Street	September 23, 2004	See also list of Carnegie libraries in California	SFDL
235	Carnegie Chinatown Branch Library		1135 Powell Street	May 2, 2002	See also list of Carnegie libraries in California	SFDL
236	Old San Francisco Mint		88 5th Street	February 21, 2003	37.7829°N 122.4071°W	NHL
237	Colombo Building		1–21 Columbus Avenue	August 23, 2002	37.7956°N 122.4037°W also known as Drexler-Colombo Building	NRHP
238	Labor Temple-Redstone Building		2926–2948 16th Street	January 16, 2004		SFDL
239	Carnegie Sunset Library		1305 18th Avenue	June 10, 2004	See also list of Carnegie libraries in California	SFDL
240	Carnegie Presidio Library		3150 Sacramento Street	June 10, 2004	See also list of Carnegie libraries in California	SFDL
241	Jose Theater/Names Project Building		2362 Market Street	May 27, 2004		SFDL
242	Infant Shelter		1201 Ortega Street	August 25, 2004		SFDL
243	Old Chronicle Building		690 Market Street		Rescinded by Ord. 54-06, File No. 050298, App. 3/31/2006, currently designated as "Significant – Category II". Now Ritz-Carlton Club and Residences	SFDL
244	Garfield Building		938–942 Market Street	September 30, 2004		SFDL
245	New Mission Theater		2550 Mission Street	May 27, 2004	37.7563°N 122.419°W	NRHP
246	James Lick Baths		165 10th Street	August 25, 2004	Also known as the People's Laundry Building	SFDL
247	Carnegie Richmond Branch Library	JPG of the Carnegie Richmond Branch Library, of the San Francisco Public Library system.	351 9th Avenue	March 3, 2005	See also list of Carnegie libraries in California	SFDL
248	Juvenile Court and Detention Home		150 Otis Street	June 14, 2006	Now Swords to Plowshares	NRHP
249	Golden Gate Park Music Concourse		Tea Garden Drive	December 16, 2005	37.77064°N 122.46749°W	SFDL
250	Shipwright's Cottage		900 Innes Avenue	May 9, 2008		SFDL
251	Glazer-Keating House		1110 Taylor Street	August 18, 2005		SFDL
252	Saint Brigid Church		2151 Van Ness Avenue	October 24, 2006		NRHP
253	Richard P. Doolan-Norman T. Larson Residence and Storefronts		557 Ashbury Street, 1500–1512 Haight Street	July 14, 2006		NRHP
254	Doggie Diner sign		Median strip of Sloat Boulevard and 45th Avenue	August 11, 2006	37.735461°N 122.502969°W	SFDL
255	Mission High School		3750 18th Street	February 9, 2007	37.761775°N 122.427306°W	SFDL
256	Richardson Hall		55 Laguna Street	September 21, 2007		SFDL
257	Woods Hall		55 Laguna Street	September 21, 2007		SFDL
258	Woods Hall Annex		55 Laguna Street	September 21, 2007		SFDL
259	Carnegie Noe Valley Branch Library		451 Jersey Street	March 10, 2008	See also list of Carnegie libraries in California	SFDL
260	Tobin House		1969 California Street	October 30, 2008		NRHP
261	Metro Theatre		2055 Union Street	July 21, 2009	37.7970°N 122.4330°W	SFDL
262	Appleton & Wolfard Libraries		1890 Chestnut Street	November 18, 2010		SFDL
263	Sam Jordan's Bar		4004–4006 3rd Street	February 6, 2013		SFDL
264	Twin Peaks Tavern		401 Castro Street	February 6, 2013		SFDL
265	Doelger Building		320–326 Judah Street	April 10, 2013		SFDL
266	Marcus Books and Jimbo's Bop City		1712–1716 Fillmore Street	February 13, 2014		SFDL
267	Swedish American Hall		2168–2174 Market Street	May 8, 2015		NRHP
268	R. L. Goldberg Building		182–198 Gough Street	May 21, 2015		SFDL
269	University Mound Ladies Home		350 University Street	November 25, 2015		SFDL
270	Cowell House		171 San Marcos Avenue	April 22, 2016		SFDL
271	Bourdette Building		90 2nd Street	May 20, 2016		SFDL
272	Alemany Emergency Hospital and Health Building		35–45 Onondaga Street	June 17, 2016		SFDL
273	Ingleside Presbyterian Church and The Great Cloud of Witnesses		1345 Ocean Avenue	November 22, 2016		SFDL
274	El Rey Theatre		1970 Ocean Avenue	July 27, 2017		SFDL
275	Third Baptist Church Complex		1399 McAllister Street	November 15, 2017		SFDL
276	Gaughran House	Gaughran House	2731–2735 Folsom Street	December 15, 2017		SFDL
277	New Era Hall		2117–2123 Market Street	March 29, 2018		SFDL
278	Phillips Building		234–246 1st Street	June 28, 2018		SFDL
279	Arthur H. Coleman Medical Center		6301 3rd Street	August 10, 2018		SFDL
280	New Pullman Hotel		228–248 Townsend Street	November 2, 2018		SFDL
281	Pile Drivers, Bridge and Structural Ironworkers Local No. 77 Union Hall		457 Bryant Street	November 2, 2018		SFDL
282	Hotel Utah		500–504 4th Street	November 2, 2018		SFDL
283	Dunham, Carrigan & Hayden Building		2 Henry Adams Street	January 25, 2019		SFDL
284	Benedict-Gieling House		22 Beaver Street	February 22, 2019		SFDL
285	Theodore Roosevelt Middle School		460 Arguello Boulevard	March 15, 2019		SFDL
286	Sunshine School		2728 Bryant Street	March 15, 2019		SFDL
287	Paper Doll (bar)		524 Union Street	June 25, 2019	37.800753°N 122.408143°W	SFDL
288	Kinmon Gakuen		2031 Bush Street	November 1, 2019		SFDL
289	"History of Medicine in California" frescoes		533 Parnassus Avenue	November 25, 2020	Ten panel fresco by Bernard Zakheim in Toland Hall auditorium at UCSF	SFDL
290	Royal Baking Company		4767–4773 Mission Street	December 23, 2020		SFDL
291	Japanese YWCA/Issei Women’s Building		1830 Sutter Street	April 30, 2021	Addition (left), Original building (right)	SFDL
292	Lyon-Martin House		651 Duncan Street	May 21, 2021		SFDL
293	Ingleside Terraces Sundial and Sundial Park		Within Entrada Court	October 8, 2021		SFDL
294	"The Making of a Fresco Showing the Building of a City" fresco		800 Chestnut Street	October 15, 2021	Fresco by Diego Riviera in the Diego Rivera Gallery, San Francisco Art Institute	SFDL
295	San Francisco Eagle Bar		396–398 12th Street	October 29, 2021		SFDL
296	Casa Sanchez Building		2778 24th Street	February 11, 2022		SFDL
297	Crocker National Bank Building		1–25 Montgomery Street	March 14, 2022		SFDL
298	"Allegory of California" fresco		155 Sansome Street	March 14, 2022	In the grand stairwell between the 10th and 11th floors of The City Club of San Francisco (former Pacific Stock Exchange Luncheon Club)	SFDL
299	Jones-Thierbach Coffee Company Building		447 Battery Street	March 16, 2022		SFDL
300	Golden Gate Valley Carnegie Library		1801 Green Street	March 22, 2022	See also list of Carnegie libraries in California	SFDL
301	Trocadero Clubhouse		Within Sigmund Stern Recreation Grove	April 15, 2022		SFDL
302	Clay Theatre		2261 Fillmore Street	May 6, 2022		SFDL
303	Mission Cultural Center for Latino Arts		2868 Mission Street	June 3, 2022		NRHP
304	Mother’s Building		Within the San Francisco Zoo	September 16, 2022		NRHP
305	Takahashi Trading Company		200 Rhode Island Street	September 22, 2022		SFDL
307	Site of the Compton’s Cafeteria Riot		Turk and Taylor Streets intersection, with portions of 101 Taylor Street	November 29, 2022		SFDL
308	St. James Presbyterian Church		240 Leland Avenue	December 13, 2022		SFDL
309	Church for the Fellowship of All Peoples		2041 Larkin Street	June 27, 2023		SFDL
310	Parkside Branch Library		1200 Taraval Street	July 25, 2023		SFDL
311	Colombo Market Arch		600 Front Street	October 3, 2023	within Sydney Walton Square	SFDL
312	Chata Gutierrez Mural		3175 24th Street	January 19, 2024		SFDL
313	Carnaval Mural		1311–1315 South Van Ness Avenue	January 19, 2024		SFDL
314	Westwood Park Entrance Gateway and Pillars		Intersections of Miramar Avenue and Monterey Boulevard, Miramar Avenue and Ocean Avenue, and Judson Avenue and Frida Kahlo Way	February 9, 2024		SFDL
315	Grand Theater		2665 Mission Street	March 5, 2024	Single screen neighborhood theater built in 1940	SFDL
316	Sacred Heart Parish Complex		546–548 Fillmore Street, 554 Fillmore Street, 735 Fell Street, and 660 Oak Street	March 28, 2024		NRHP
317	San Francisco Fire Station No. 44		1298 Girard Street	May 17, 2024		SFDL
318	Gregangelo Museum		225 San Leandro Way	June 21, 2024		SFDL
319	Rainbow Flag Installation at Harvey Milk Plaza, by Gilbert Baker		Southwest corner of the intersection of Market Street and Castro Street	September 13, 2024		SFDL
320	San Francisco Ladies Protection and Relief Society		3400 Laguna Street	December 17, 2024		SFDL

== San Francisco Landmark Districts ==
Since 1972, the City of San Francisco has designated thirteen local landmark districts ranging in size from a handful of buildings to several hundred properties. Landmark districts are regulated by Article 10 of the Planning Code.

#	Name	Image	Size	Year Designated	Description
1	Jackson Square		8 Blocks, 82 Parcels	1972	Earliest surviving commercial area features commercial and mixed-use buildings erected in the 1850s to 1860s.
2	Webster Street		3 Blocks, 25 Parcels	1981	Residential district in the Western Addition features a unified collection in the Italianate style.
3	Northeast Waterfront		9 Blocks, 52 Parcels	1983	Commercial and industrial district reflects waterfront storage and maritime activities, from the Gold Rush to World War II.
4	Alamo Square		16 Blocks, 281 Parcels	1984	Residential district features richly ornamented houses in a range of Victorian- and Edwardian-era styles.
5	Liberty Hill Historic District		10 Blocks, 298 Parcels	1985	Victorian-era residences designed primarily in the Italianate, Stick, and Queen Anne styles in Mission District.
6	Telegraph Hill		6 Blocks, 90 Parcels	1986	Eclectic hillside district features the largest concentration of pre-1870s buildings accessible only via narrow pedestrian-only lanes and staircases.
7	Blackstone Court		1 Block, 4 Parcels	1987	Residential district centered around the now-filled Washerwoman's Lagoon on a pre-Gold Rush trail of pre-1906 development in the Marina District.
8	South End		6 Blocks, 84 Parcels	1990	Industrial and warehouse of brick and reinforced concrete single- and multi-story warehouses erected between 1906 and 1929.
9	Bush Street–Cottage Row		2 Blocks, 23 Parcels	1991	Residential buildings of flat front Italianate and Stick design in Japantown.
10	Civic Center		15 Blocks, 61 Parcels	1996	Monumental Beaux Arts Classical design institutional buildings flanking a central open space.
11	Dogpatch		9 Blocks, 131 Parcels	2003	Oldest enclave of industrial workers’ housing in San Francisco located east of Potrero Hill.
12	Market Street Masonry		5 Blocks, 8 Parcels	2013	Discontiguous district of 8 structures built between 1911 and 1925. Each building is constructed of reinforced concrete or a combination of brick and reinforced concrete. All are designed by San Francisco master architects.
13	Duboce Park		4 Blocks, 90 Parcels	2013	Residential district featuring well-preserved Victorian- and Edwardian-era homes, many in the Queen Anne style. The district includes Duboce Park.

== See also ==
- California Historical Landmarks in San Francisco County, California
- National Register of Historic Places listings in San Francisco
