= Mish House =

Historic house in San Francisco

- U.S. National Register of Historic Places
- San Francisco Designated Landmark
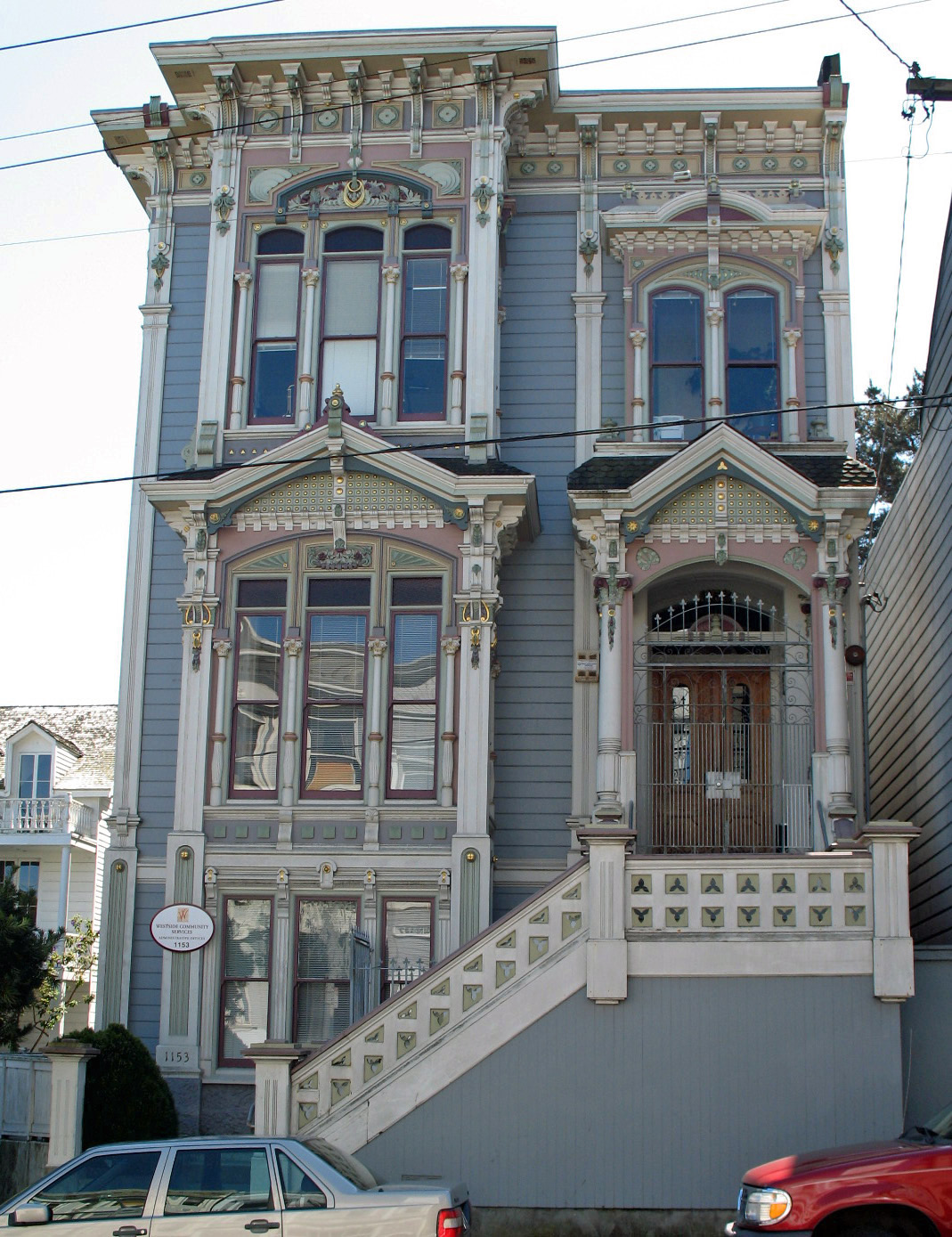

- Location within San Francisco County Location within California Location within the United States
- Location: 1153 Oak Street, San Francisco, California, 94117, U.S.
- Coordinates: 37.772894°N 122.438290°W
- Architects: McDougall & Sons
- Architectural style: Stick style, Eastlake movement
- NRHP reference No.: 79000534
- SFDL No.: 62

Significant dates
- Added to NRHP: May 21, 1979
- Designated SFDL: July 6, 1974

The Mish House, also known as the Sarah Mish House, is a historic house built in 1885 and located in 1153 Oak Street in the Haight-Ashbury neighborhood of San Francisco, California.

The house is listed as a San Francisco Designated Landmark since July 6, 1974; and one of the National Register of Historic Places since May 21, 1979.

== History ==
The Mish House was designed by architects McDougall and Sons, and originally built in 1885 at 407 Divisadero Street. It was built in the Stick-Eastlake style (a combination of Stick style and Eastlake movement). The house was moved in 1889 to its current location at 1153 Oak Street.

In 1928, the house was sold and the following year it was converted into apartments. By 1930, the ballroom portion of the building was used as a dance school. In 1975 and 1976, the house was restored by a local preservation group, in hopes of improving the neighborhood. It is located near the Abner Phelps House, another historic building.

== Mish family ==
The house was built for Phenes and Sarah Mish and their 10 children. The Mish family moved to San Francisco in 1849. Phenes Mish (1825–1895) was born in Poznań, Kingdom of Prussia (now Poland) and had owned a dry goods importing business called Mish and Sons, he also served as President of Congregation Sherith Israel. Sarah Cohen Mish (1832–1916) was English-born and owned a dressmaking and millinery business with two locations, and her millinery was the largest on the west coast. After Sarah's death in 1916, the house was passed to the estate heirs.

Lily Schlesinger (née Mish), daughter of Phenes and Sarah, was raised in the Mish House and became an opera singer and whistler; and her daughter was Irene Anderson (née Schlesinger), was a dancer and one of the founders of the Anderson Sisters School of Dancing in San Francisco.

== See also ==
- List of San Francisco Designated Landmarks
- National Register of Historic Places listings in San Francisco
