= Columbia Savings Bank Building =

Columbus Savings Bank
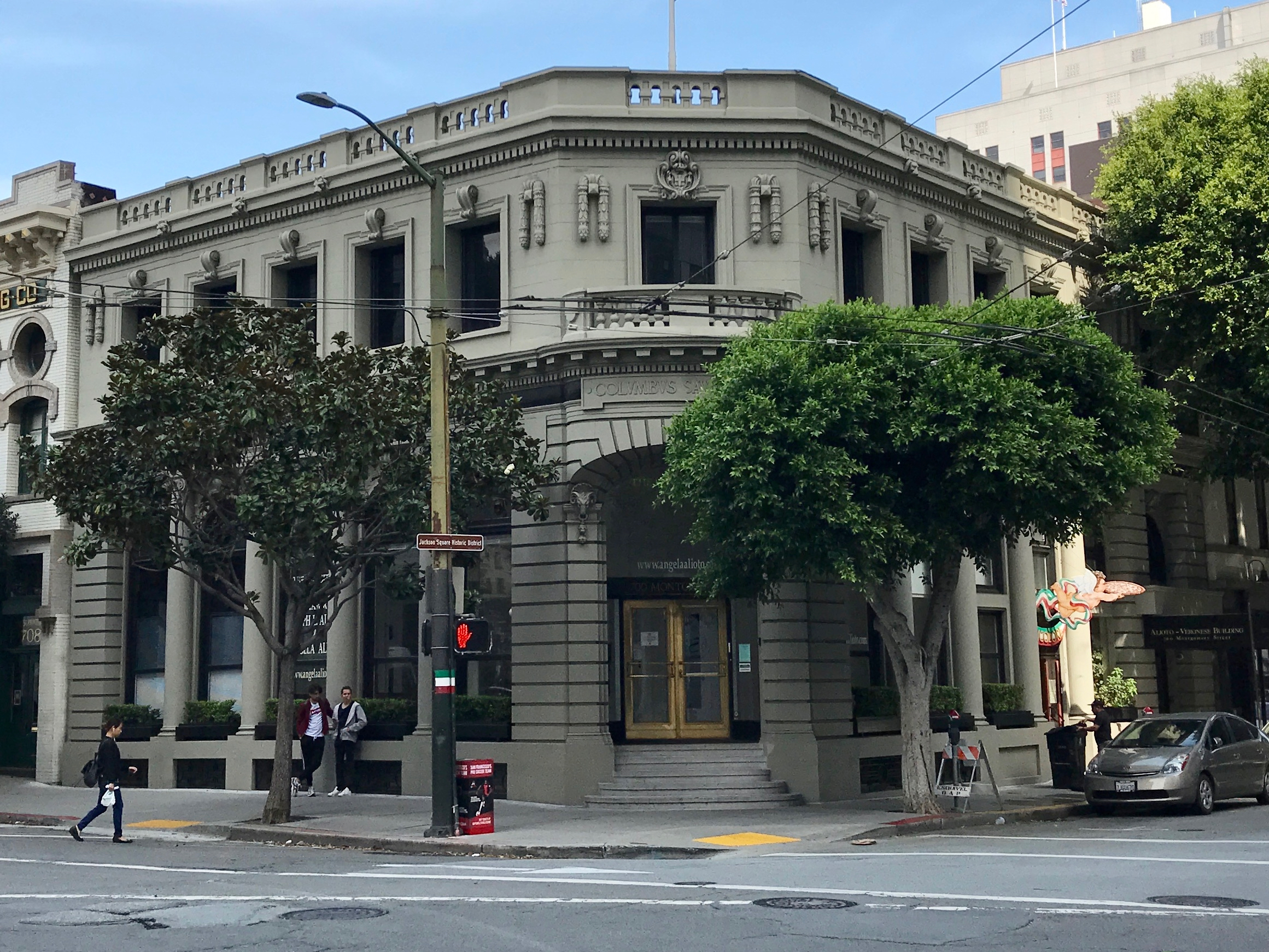

- Location within San Francisco
- 37.795657°N 122.403194°W
- Type: building
- Location: 700 Montgomery Street

History
- Built: 1904

Site notes
- Area: Jackson Square Historic District
- Architect(s): Frederick Herman Meyer and Smith O'Brien
- Architectural style: Classical Revival

San Francisco Designated Landmark
- Official name: Columbia Savings Bank Building
- Designated: 10/8/2000
- Reference no.: 212

The Columbia Savings Bank Building, also known as the Columbus Savings Bank, is a landmark office building located at 700 Montgomery Street in the Financial District of San Francisco, California.

The building is registered as a San Francisco Landmark. It was deemed significant as the "oldest of four buildings that represent the beginning of Italian banking in San Francisco", along with the Bank of Italy building and two other bank buildings.

== Tenants ==
The Columbia Savings Bank Building was originally built for the Columbus Savings and Loan Society, as a bank which primarily served the Italian community in San Francisco.

In 1923 the building at 700 Montgomery became, for two years, the Columbus Branch of the Bank of Italy.

From 1939 to 1953 the ground floor was occupied by the Pisani Printing and Publishing Company.

The upper floor was occupied by the Italian consulate from 1948 to 1951, and the Indonesian consulate from 1954 to 1956.

From 1973 until 1996, the building was the studio for KIOI radio station.

Beginning in 2000, it hosted the law offices of former Mayor Joseph L. Alioto and his daughter, Angela Alioto.

== Synonymous places ==
There was a postwar Columbia Savings Bank building in Los Angeles. It was demolished in 2009. It was standing at the southeast corner of Wilshire and La Brea (on the Miracle Mile). It had turned into a Korean church (Wilshire Grace Church) before its destruction.
