= Our Lady of Guadalupe Church (San Francisco) =

Coordinates: 37.7974°N 122.4123°W

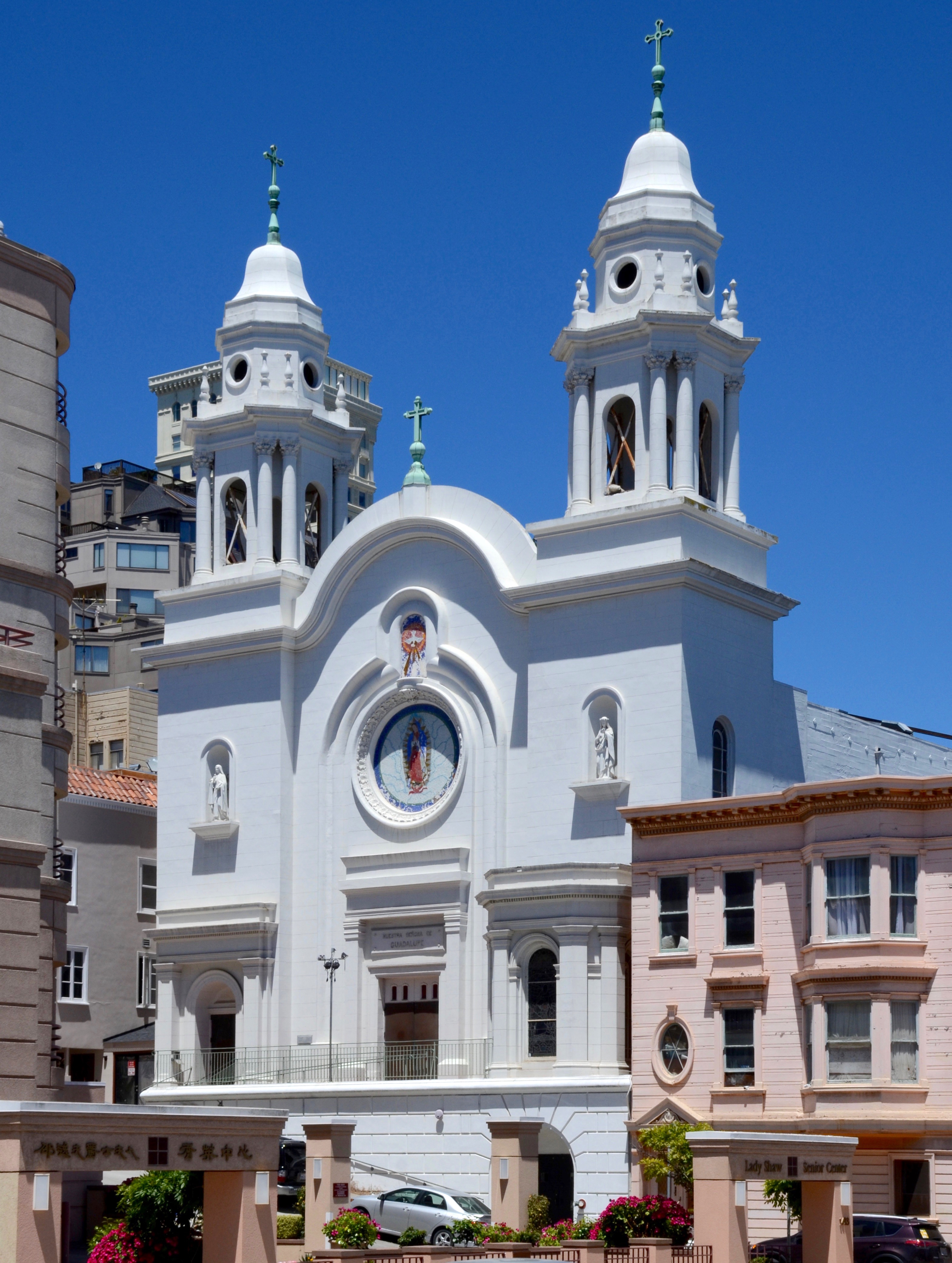
Our Lady of Guadalupe Church in 2018

The Church of Our Lady of Guadalupe (Spanish: Iglesia de Nuestra Senora de Guadalupe), is a former Catholic church located at 906 Broadway above the Broadway Tunnel in the Russian Hill neighborhood of San Francisco, California, United States. Built in 1912 as a replacement for an 1880 church that was destroyed by the 1906 San Francisco earthquake and ensuing fire, it closed in 1992 and has most recently been redeveloped as a tech business incubator and event space with the adjacent rectory converted to co-living spaces. It is a designated city landmark.

== History ==
The congregation was formed by Mexican, Spanish, and Portuguese immigrants in 1875. The Church of Our Lady of Guadalupe was completed in 1880, but was destroyed in April 1906 by the San Francisco earthquake and the fire that followed. The current church was consecrated in 1912. In 1992 Archbishop John R. Quinn ordered the closure of the church.

An application for declaring the structure a historic monument was sent to the Office of Historical Monuments (now known as Office Of Historic Preservation) and then to the judgment of the Office of City Planning. About 5000 signatures were collected, and by a vote of the Board of Supervisors, on October 15, 1993 the church was designated as city landmark no. 204. In August 2016, the Historic Preservation Commission proposed adding the interior to the landmark designation. The amending ordinance was passed on April 16, 2019.

In 1993, the Archdiocese of San Francisco ordered the church to be used to house St. Mary's Chinese School, which moved there on December 1, 1994.

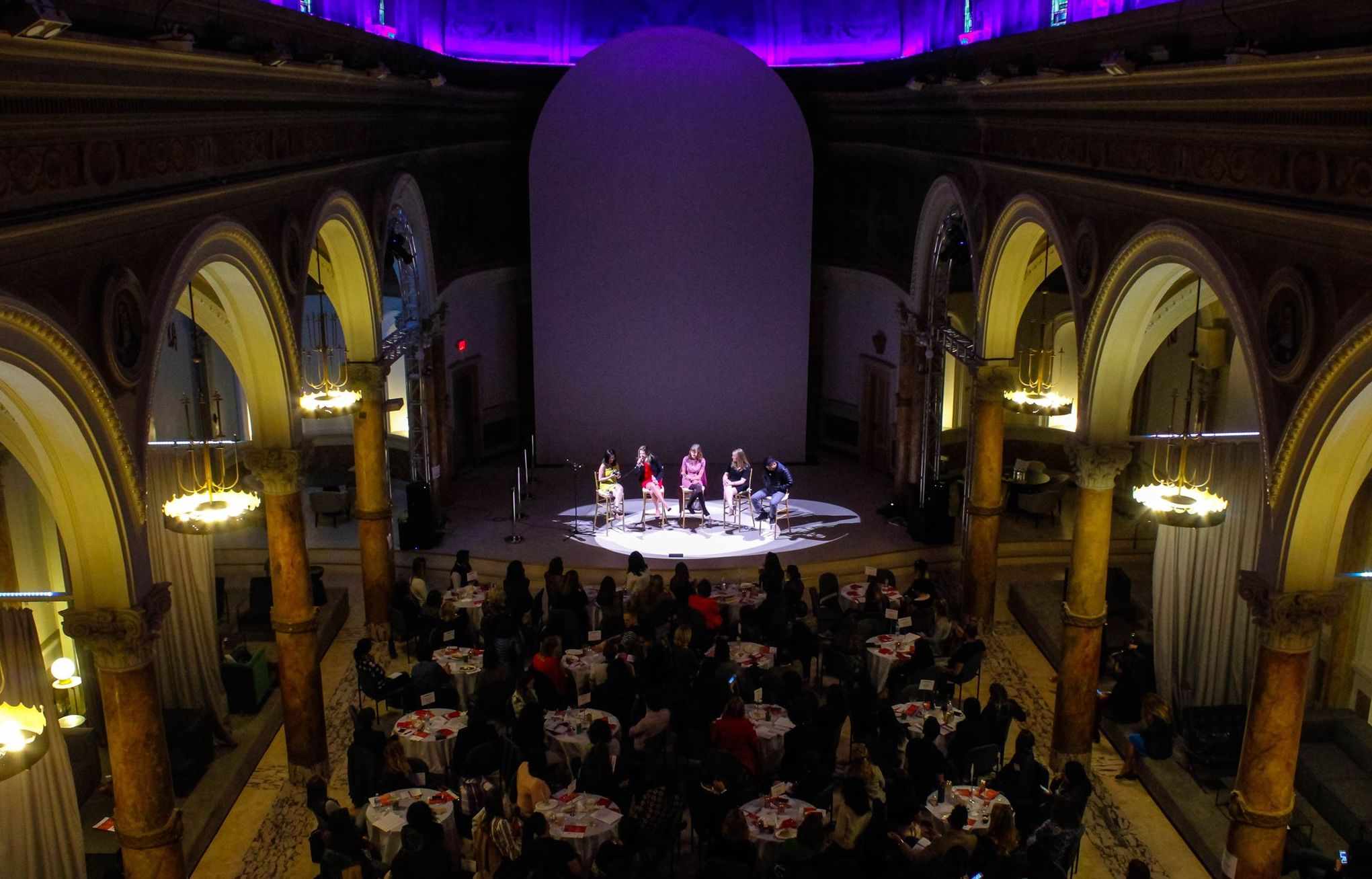
Conference at 906.World, 2017

The church was listed for sale in 2013 and was purchased by San Francisco-based investors who renovated it and offered it for sale again in 2015. After negotiations with the city to lease it as a hub for services for the homeless, it was purchased in 2016 by GVA Capital Group, led by Russian entrepreneur Pavel Cherkashin, and the interior was redeveloped into a co-working tech incubator and arts and culture conference space called 906.World Cultural Center; Cherkashin said his intention was for the center to bring people together as the church had formerly done. The adjacent rectory was converted into 17 co-living spaces. After the owners defaulted on the purchase loan, both buildings were repossessed and in early January 2024 were sold to an out-of-town investor for approximately half their 2016 price.

== Building ==
The present church was designed by architects Frank T. Shea and John D. Lofquist in the Mission Revival style. The primary facade, at the south end, is flanked by twin towers topped by gilded crosses. The main entrance is rectangular and recessed, flanked by a secondary entrance with a round arch and a rectangular bay with basket arched openings. At the second floor level, a central rose window surmounted by a mosaic figure is flanked by arched niches containing sculpted figures. It was one of the first churches in the United States built of reinforced concrete.

The interior is decorated with frescos in Renaissance and Baroque style by Luigi Brusatori, an Italian master painter, which were completed in 1916. The faces of the angels on the ceiling were modeled after members of the children's choir.

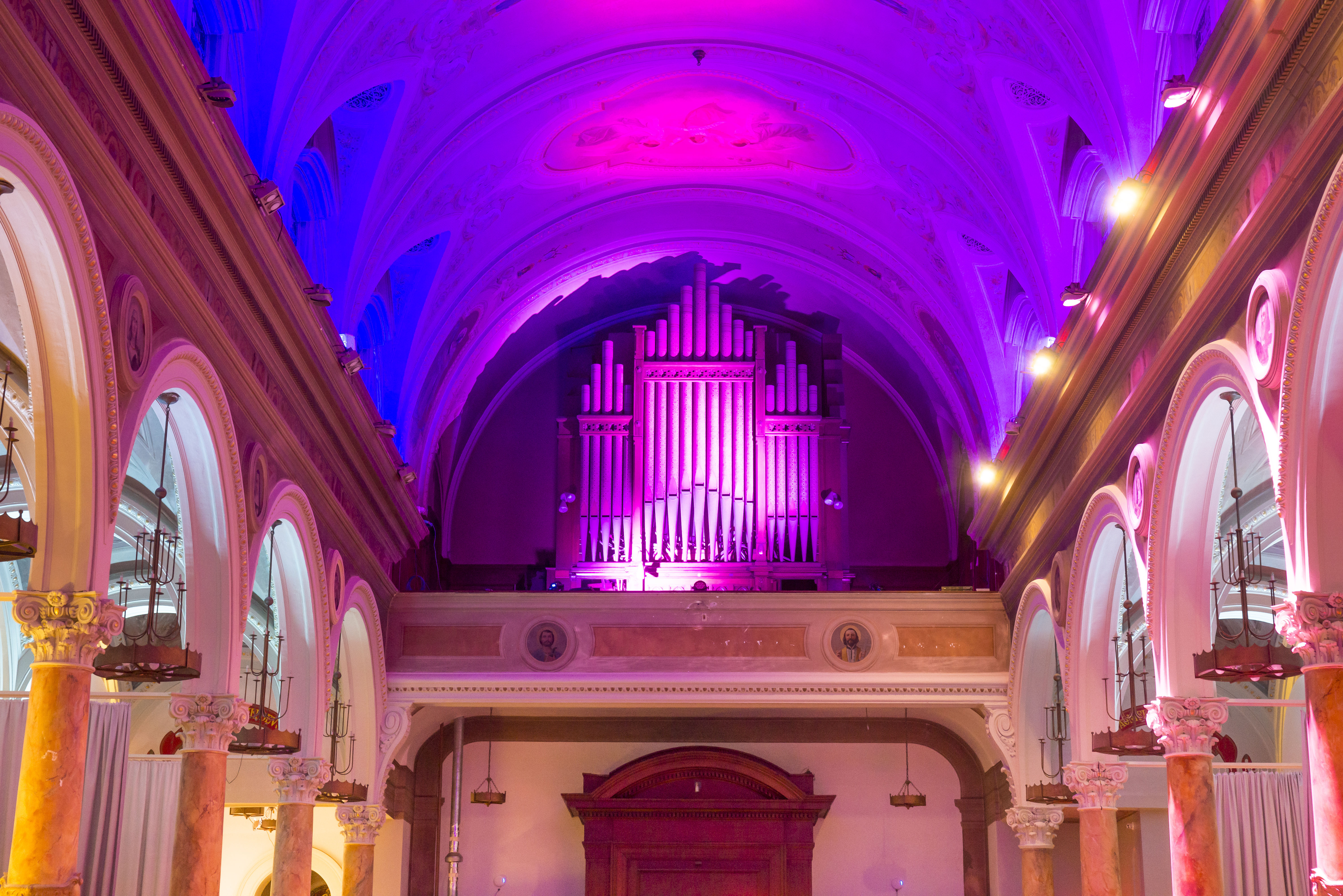
Interior view with organ, 2017

== Organ ==
A 29-rank, 2-manual mechanical Hook & Hastings organ, built in Boston, Massachusetts, in 1888, was moved to the church in 1912 from the First Unitarian Church, where it was one of three Hook and Hastings organs known to have survived the 1906 earthquake. It remains in the church in unaltered condition and is designated by the Organ Historical Society. It is the largest unaltered 19th-century pipe organ in California.
