= Roos House (San Francisco) =

Historic house in California, US

- U.S. National Register of Historic Places
- San Francisco Designated Landmark
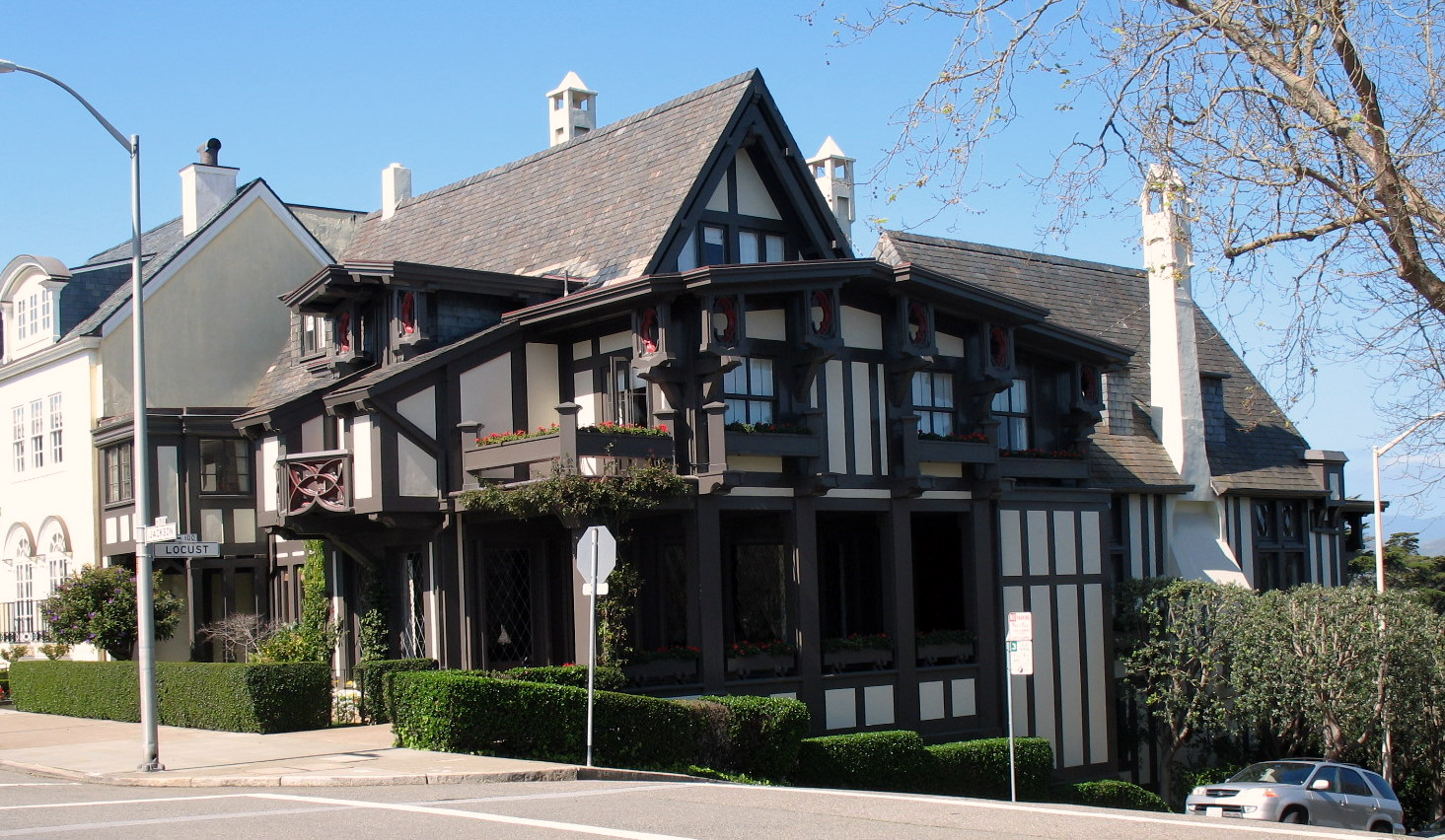
- Roos House, 2010

- Location within California
- Location: 3500 Jackson Street, San Francisco, California, U.S.
- Coordinates: 37°47′26″N 122°27′05″W
- Area: less than one acre
- Built: 1909; 117 years ago
- Architect: Bernard Maybeck
- Architectural style: Tudor Revival
- NRHP reference No.: 09000805
- SFDL No.: 56

Significant dates
- Added to NRHP: October 8, 2009
- Designated SFDL: August 6, 1973

The Roos House is a historic single family house built in 1909 in the Presidio Heights neighborhood of San Francisco, California. It is listed as a San Francisco Designated Landmark (no. 56) since 1973; and on the National Register of Historic Places since October 8, 2009, for the architecture.

== History ==
The Roos House is a three-story-over basement wood frame house and it is 9,000 square feet (840 m^{2}). It was built in 1909, designed in a Tudor Revival style with Gothic ornamentation by architect Bernard Maybeck. Maybeck also designed the light fixtures throughout the house, and some of the furniture. It is roughly in a T–shaped plan, and each section of the house is capped by a gable roof.

The rear lot that was once used as a formal vegetable garden (also designed by Maybeck) was sold in 1989, to help with the cost of the house repairs after the 1989 Loma Prieta earthquake.

== See also ==
- List of San Francisco Designated Landmarks
- National Register of Historic Places listings in San Francisco
