= Market Street Railway Substation =

Historic building in San Francisco, California

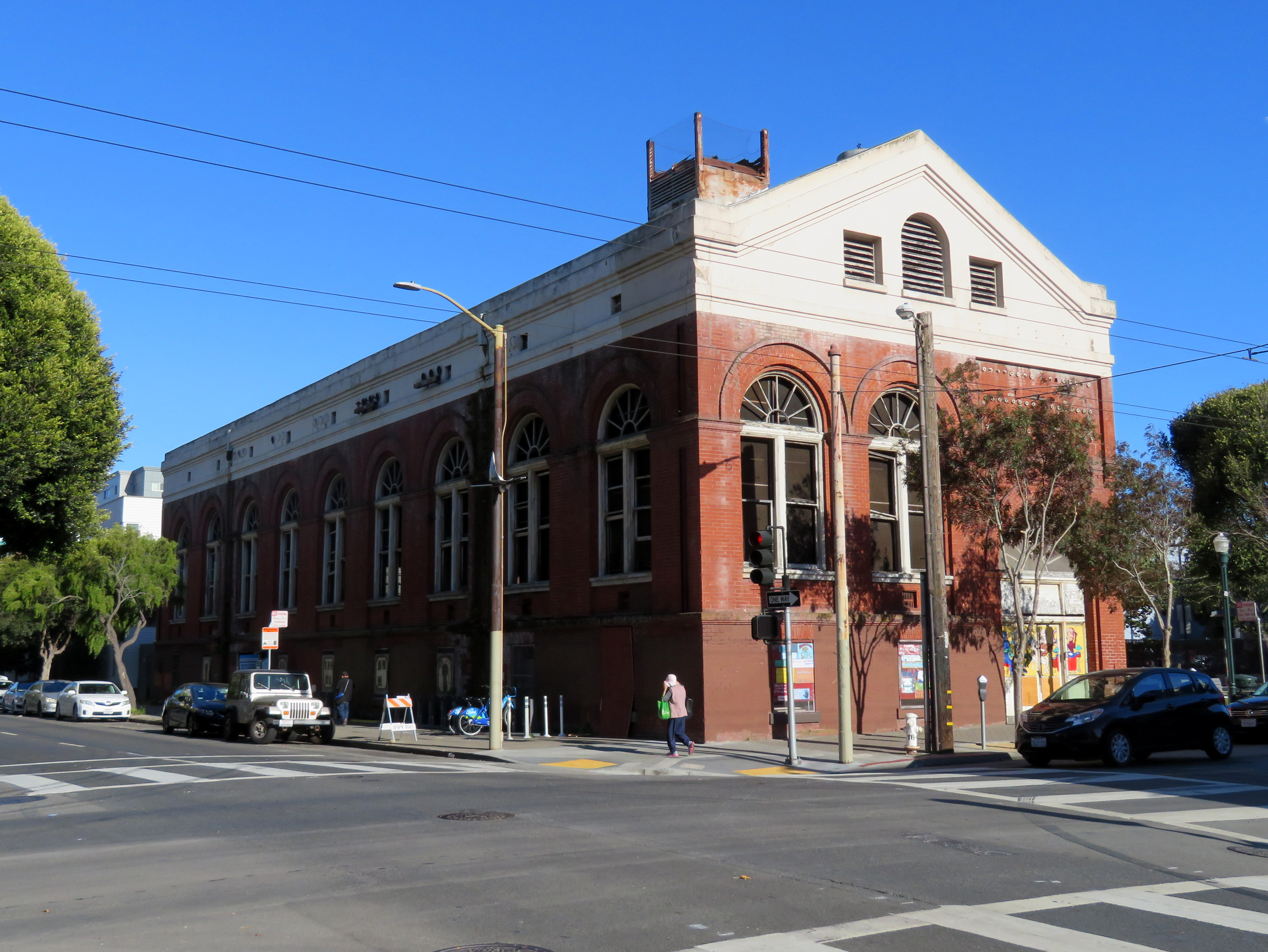
- Interactive map of Market Street Railway Substation
- 37.780419°N 122.431797°W
- Location: 1190 Fillmore Street, San Francisco, California, U.S.

History
- Built: 1902; 124 years ago

San Francisco Designated Landmark
- Designated: April 23, 1979
- Reference no.: 105

The Market Street Railway Substation in the Fillmore District of San Francisco, California, is a historic building. It has been listed as a San Francisco Designated Landmark (No. 105) since 1979.

== History ==
The Market Street Railway Substation was active from 1902 until 1978, and supplied power to the San Francisco Railroad, Market Street Railway, and later San Francisco Municipal Railway (MUNI). The building is made of brick and sandstone, and it survived the 1906 San Francisco earthquake.

The building had been earmarked for redevelopment by the San Francisco Redevelopment Agency, which closed in 2012, and after the building was deeded to the City of San Francisco. In 2021, the building appeared to be collapsing, and needed emergency repairs.

== See also ==
- List of San Francisco Designated Landmarks
- Market Street Railway (nonprofit)
