= Casebolt House =

c. 1865 house in San Francisco, California

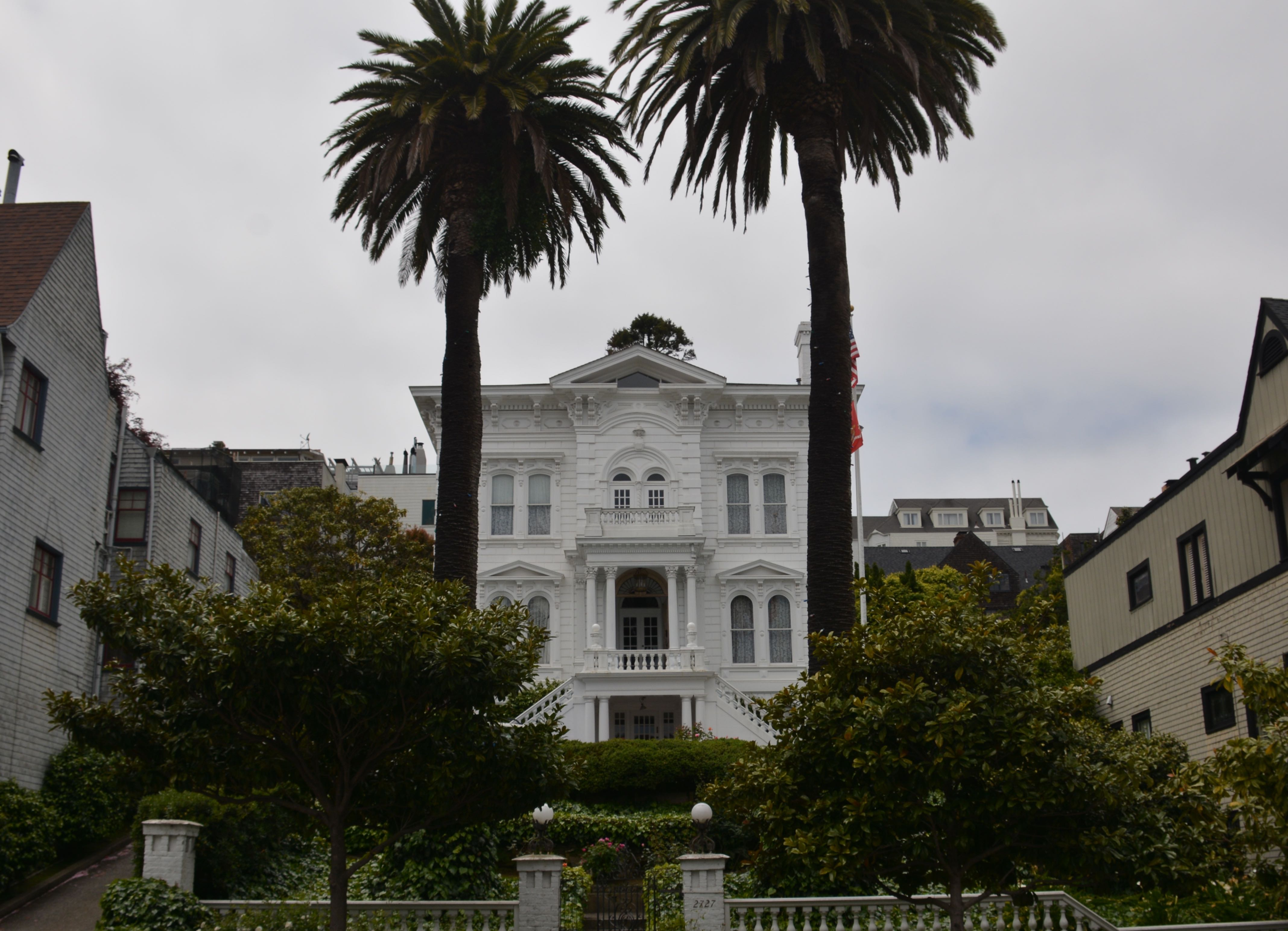

- Location within San Francisco County Location within California
- 37.7952°N 122.4389°W
- Location: 2727 Pierce Street, San Francisco, California, U.S.

History
- Built: c. 1865
- Built for: Henry Casebolt

Site notes
- Architect(s): Hoagland and Newsom
- Architectural style: Italianate

San Francisco Designated Landmark
- Designated: March 5, 1973
- Reference no.: 51

Casebolt House is a historic residence in the Cow Hollow district of San Francisco, California, U.S. It is the oldest house in the neighborhood, built in c. 1865. It is a San Francisco designated landmark since 1973.

== History ==
The Casebolt House was designed by architects Hoagland and Newsom, and built in c. 1865 for Henry Casebolt (c. 1816–1892), a Virginia-born blacksmith, and transit business magnate. He was the owner of the Sutter St., Polk St., and Larkin St. cable car lines; and he manufactured and imported his cable cars, and carriages. Casebolt lived in the house with his wife and eleven children, until his death in 1892.

The Casebolt House is four stories tall with 7 bedrooms and 4 bathrooms in roughly 5,875 square feet (545.8 m^{2}); it has a large garden, and the house is set away from the street. It contains a balcony with a good view. Like many California buildings at the time period, the house was built with salvaged materials.

The home was owned by Judge Carlos Bea and Louise Bea.

== See also ==
- List of San Francisco Designated Landmarks
