= St. Paulus Lutheran Church =

Historic church in California, United States

- U.S. National Register of Historic Places
- San Francisco Designated Landmark
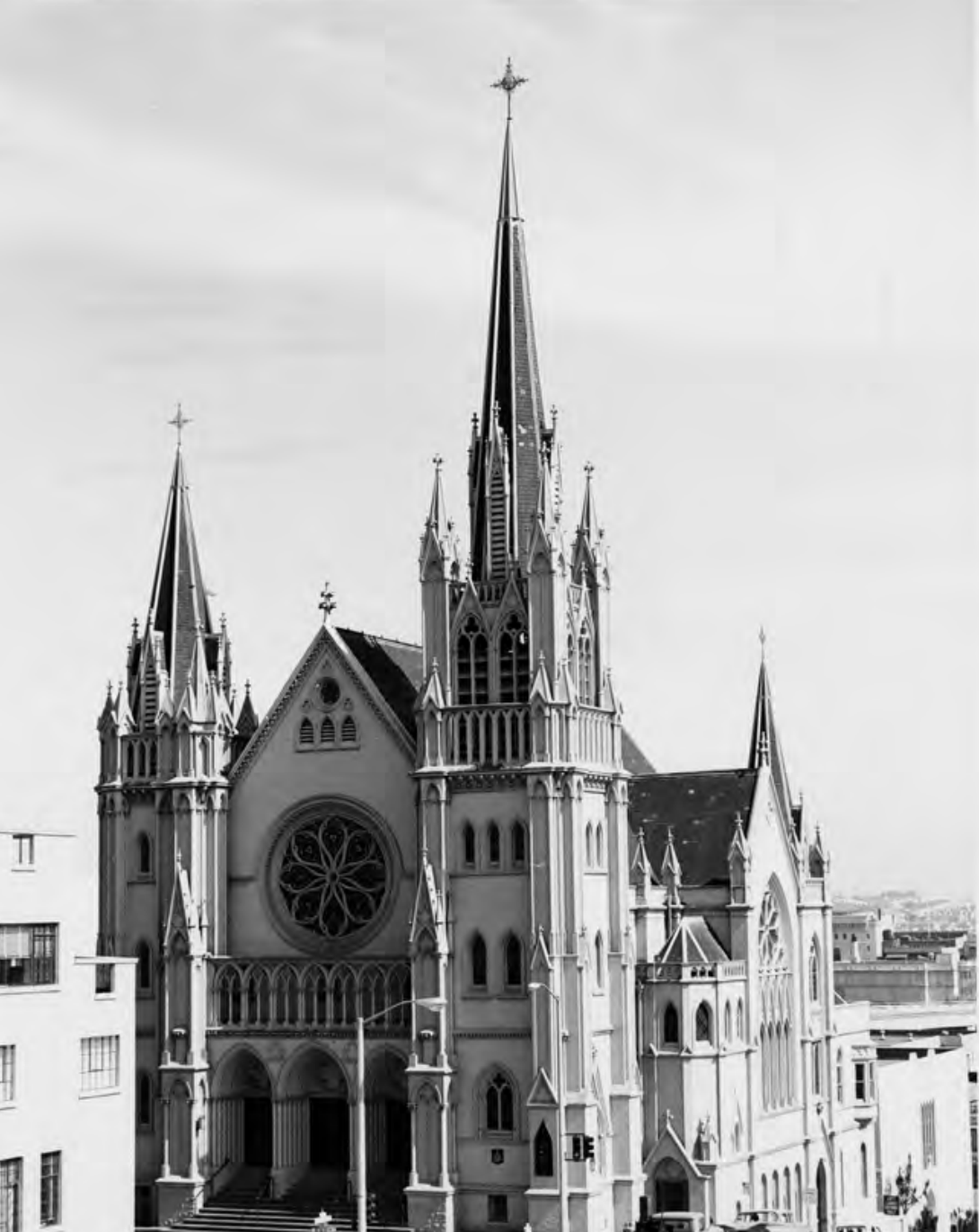

- Location within San Francisco County Location within California Location within the United States
- Location: 999 Eddy Street, San Francisco, California
- Coordinates: 37°46′56″N 122°25′21″W
- Area: 0.3 acres (0.12 ha)
- Built: 1894
- Architects: Krafft, Julius E.; Bluns, C.
- Architectural style: Late Gothic Revival, Other, Carpenter Gothic
- NRHP reference No.: 82002251
- SFDL No.: 116

Significant dates
- Added to NRHP: February 11, 1982
- Designated SFDL: (rescinded)

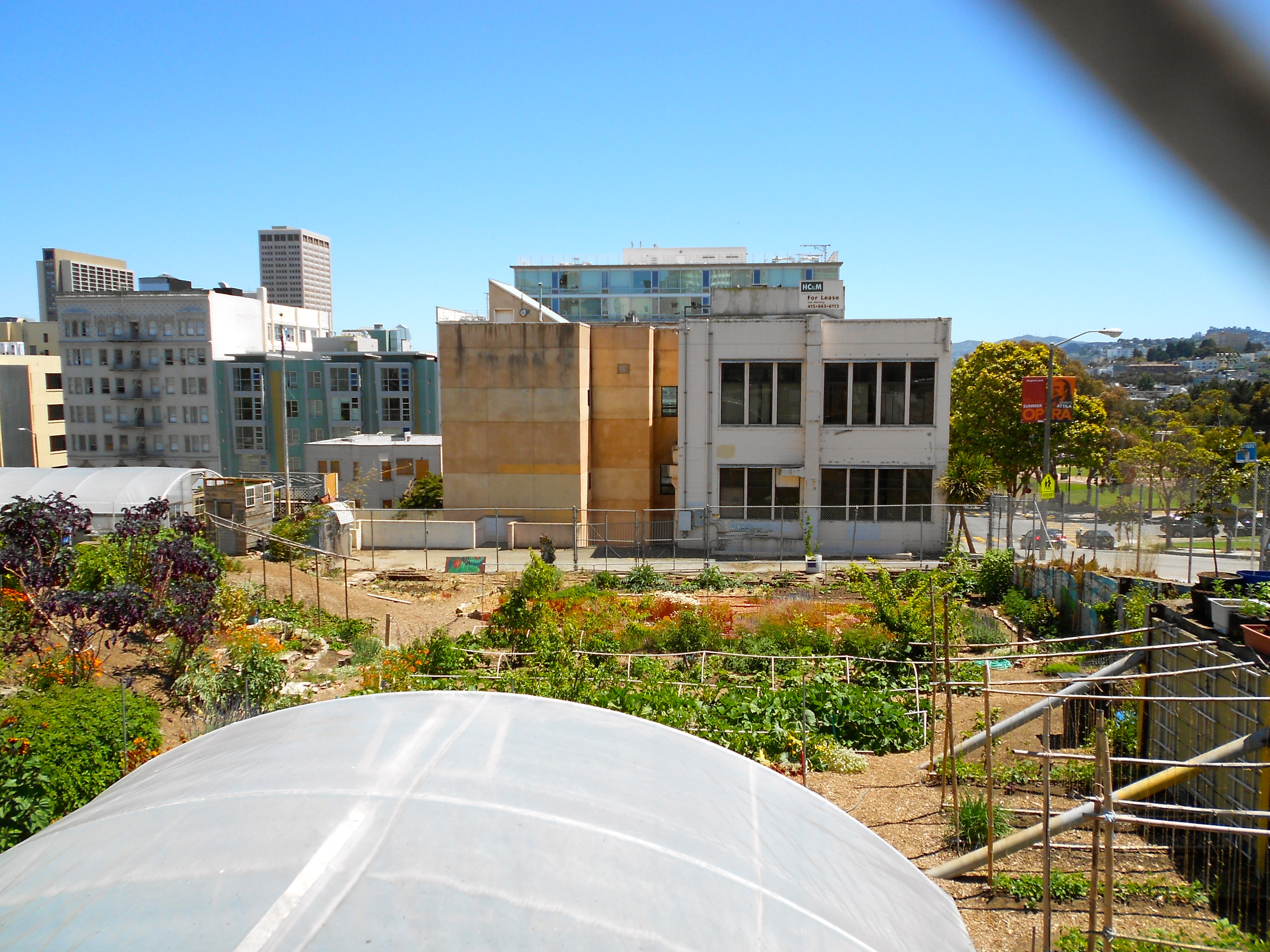
999 Eddy Street community garden in 2012

St. Paulus Lutheran Church was a historic church located at 999 Eddy Street in San Francisco, California. The church was built from 1892 to 1894 and was located next to Jefferson Square Park.

It was added to the National Register of Historic Places in 1982. On October 5, 1980, the church became San Francisco Designated Landmark number 116. The church's designated landmark status was rescinded after the church was destroyed by fire on November 5, 1995.

== History ==
The church loaned a 1/3 acre (1,300 m^{2}) parcel of the site to The Free Farm, for growing and giving away organic produce. On October 7, 2014, the San Francisco real estate website Socketsite announced the church had put the site up for sale. Construction was underway at the site in April 2019, and Saint Paulus is scheduled to reopen at this original site before the end of 2023.

== In popular culture ==
The church is seen in the background of a few shots in the Alfred Hitchcock film Vertigo (1958) with James Stewart and Kim Novak.

== See also ==
- List of San Francisco Designated Landmarks
