= Quinn House, San Francisco =

Historic house in San Francisco

Quinn House
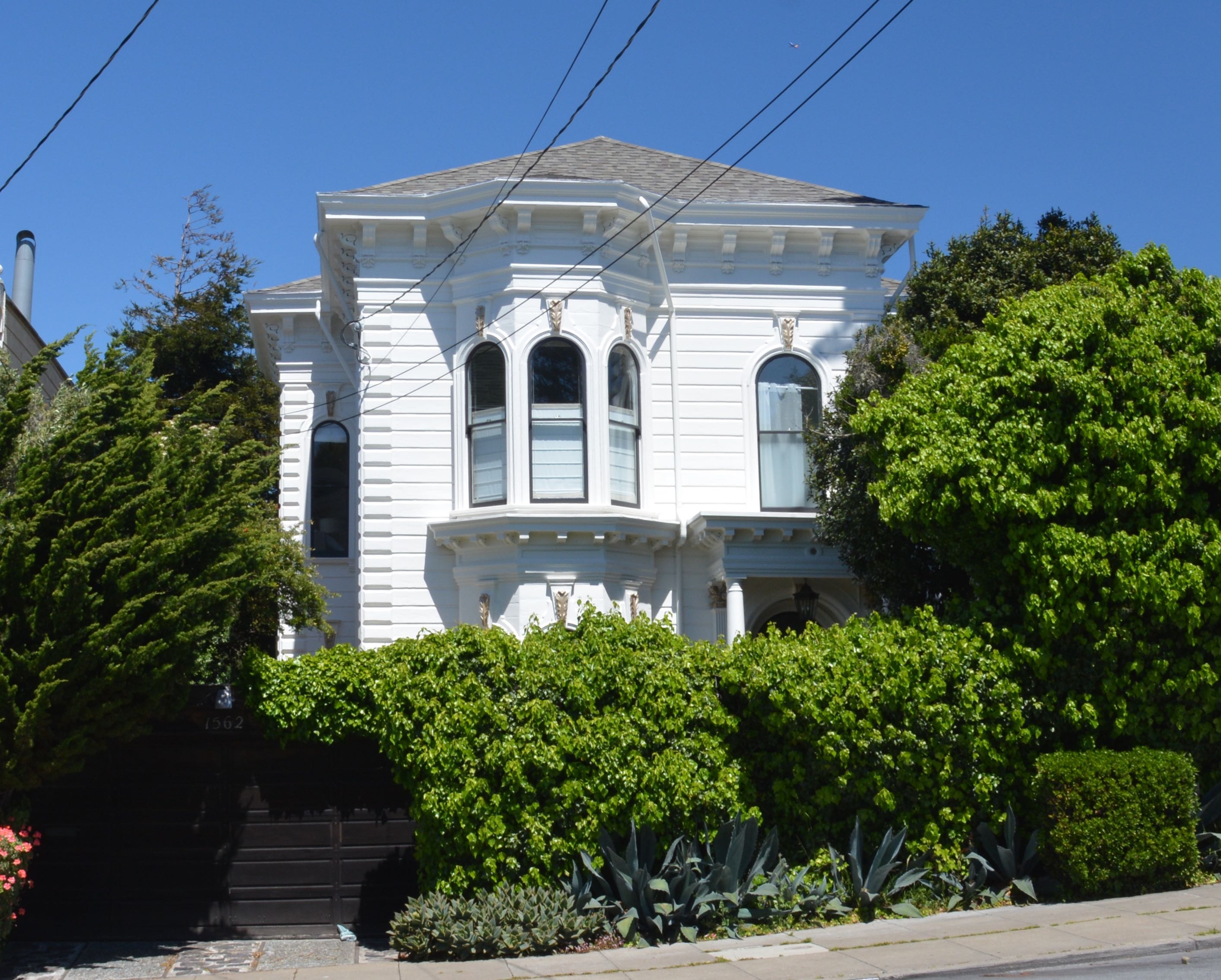

- Location within San Francisco County Location within California Location within the United States
- 37.735949°N 122.388496°W
- Location: 1562 McKinnon Avenue, San Francisco, California, U.S.

History
- Built: between 1870 and 1875
- Built for: Mary Quinn

Site notes
- Architectural style: Italianate

San Francisco Designated Landmark
- Designated: July 6, 1974
- Reference no.: 63

The Quinn House is a historic house built c. 1870 and located in the Bayview–Hunters Point neighborhood of San Francisco, California.

The Quinn House has been listed as a San Francisco Designated Landmark since July 6, 1974.

== History ==
The Quinn House is located at 1562 McKinnon Avenue in San Francisco. It was built for Mary Quinn in c. 1870, and the house remained in the Quinn family for 83 years. It is a two-story Italianate-style wooden structure with a prominent bay window. In the 1950s, the Quinn sisters lived on separate floors of the building and didn’t get along; as a result the house was painted separately by floor level. In 1958, the Quinn family sold the house.

In 1965, the house was used as the headquarters of the consumer pilot program, Bay Area Neighborhood Development (BAND) led by Ira Henderson; later known as the Redevelopment Hunters Point site office.

In 2014, the Quinn House sold for over USD $1 million, making it one of the most expensive houses in the Bayview.

== See also ==
- List of San Francisco Designated Landmarks
