= Havens Mansion and Carriage House =

Building in San Francisco

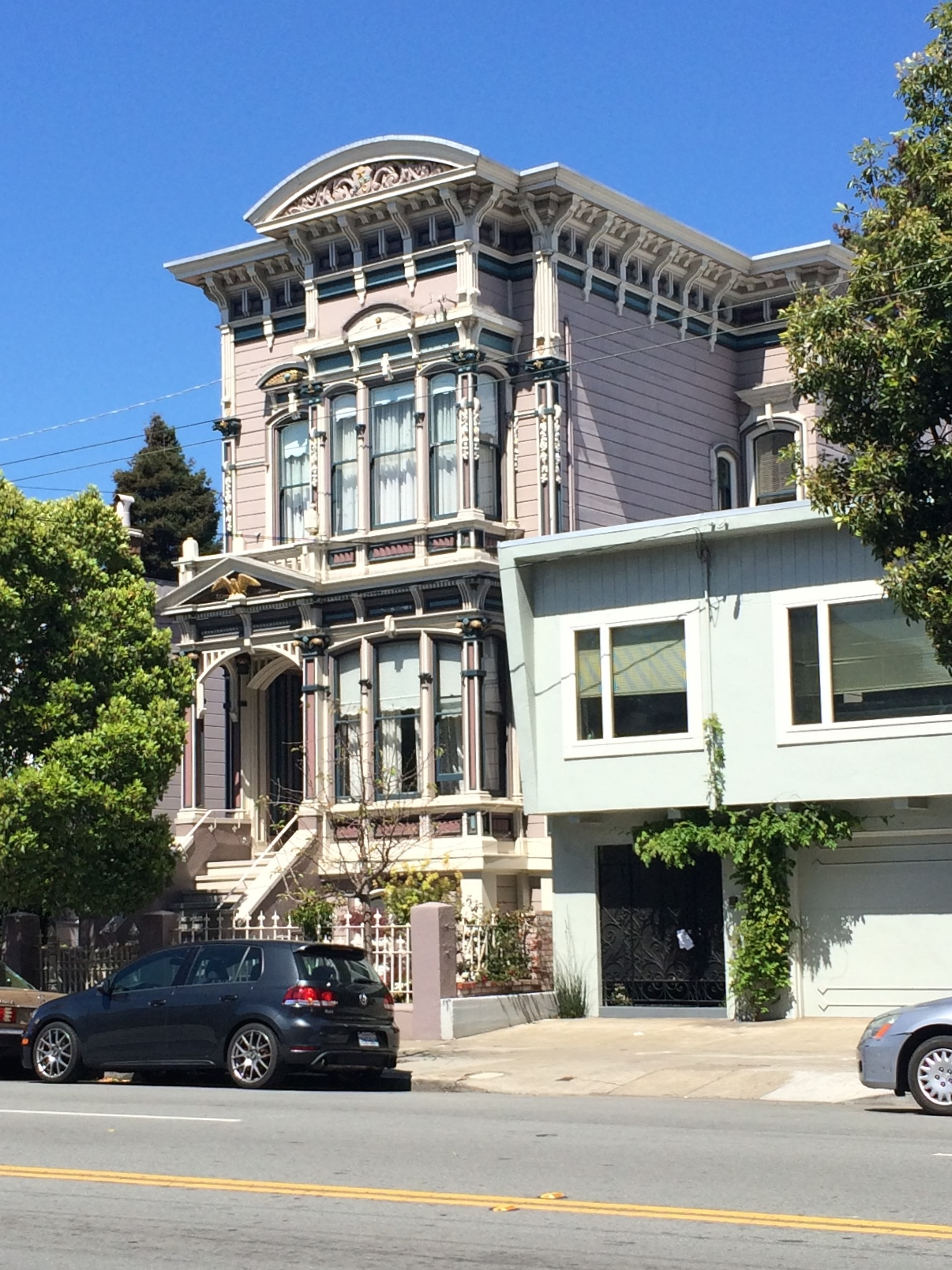
- Interactive map of Havens Mansion and Carriage House
- Location: 1381 South Van Ness St. San Francisco, California, United States
- Coordinates: 37.751188°N 122.415965°W
- Built: 1884; 142 years ago
- Architect: Havens & Toepke
- Architectural styles: Second Empire, Italianate style, Stick style

San Francisco Designated Landmark
- Designated: April 11, 1981
- Reference no.: 125

The Havens Mansion and Carriage House is a historic residential building in the Mission District of San Francisco, California, United States. It was listed as a San Francisco Designated Landmark since 1981. It is a private residence and is not open to the public.

== History ==
The house was built in 1884 by Havens & Toepke, for architect Charles I. Havens (1849–1916) personal residence. Havens designed several building in downtown San Francisco. The Havens Mansion reflects architecture of 1880s in San Francisco's "Mansion Row" and a still intact carriage house. Some sources list the building as Second Empire style (despite no mansard roof), and others as an Italianate style and/or Stick style.

== See also ==
- List of San Francisco Designated Landmarks
- Cesar Chavez Street
- Frank C. Havens
