= Ingleside Presbyterian Church =

Church in San Francisco, USA

Coordinates: 37°43′26″N 122°27′25″W

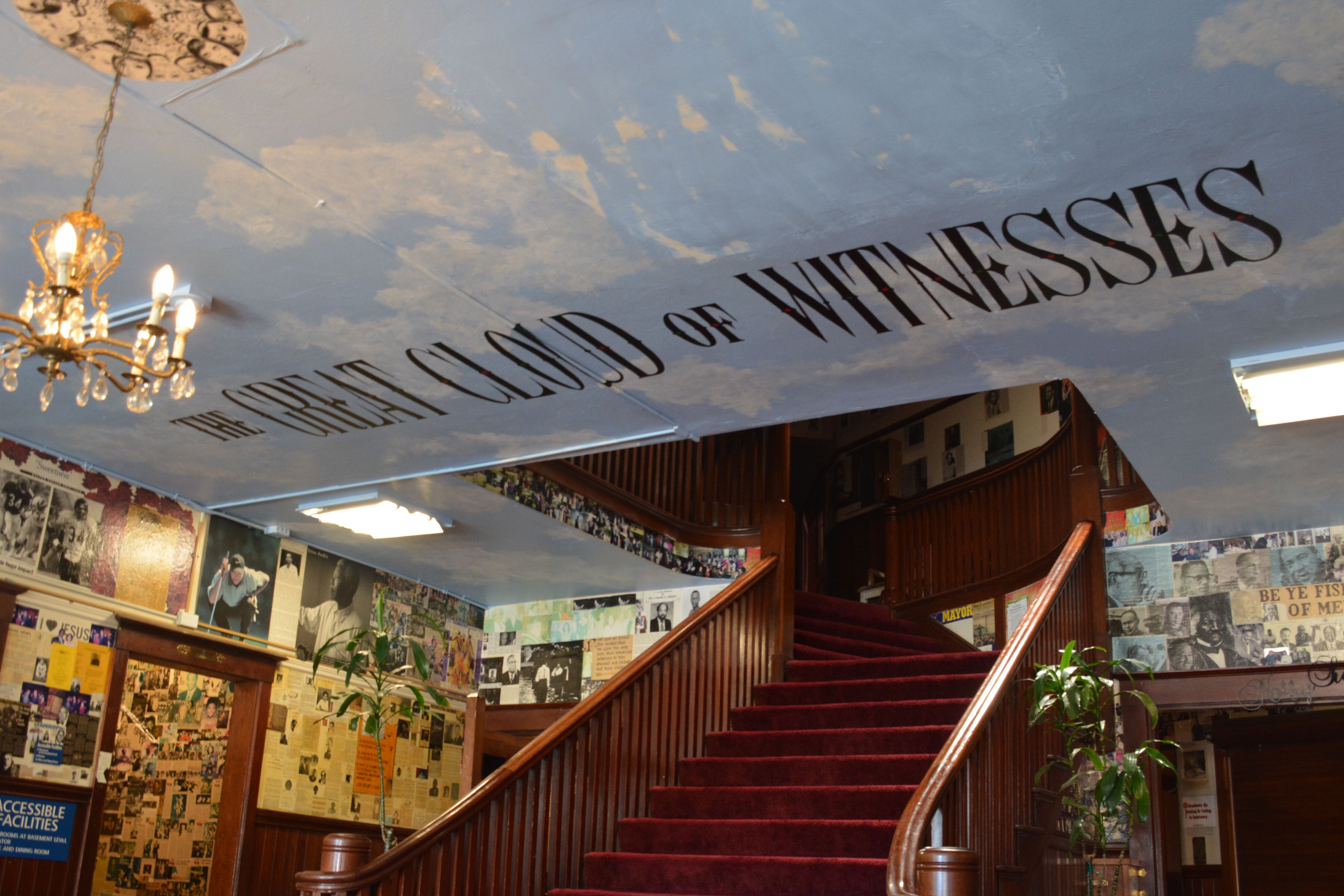
Ingleside Presbyterian Church and The Great Cloud of Witnesses

Ingleside Presbyterian Church is a historically African American church in the Ingleside neighborhood of San Francisco. The church is a San Francisco landmark and is noted for the collection of pictures and paintings that cover the interior walls as murals named The Great Cloud of Witnesses.

The paintings and portraits primarily depict figures from African American history and were originally put in the building when eventual pastor Roland Gordon was still in seminary. The churches demographics and population have shifted over time, at one point only having four members. While the church's parishioners remain predominantly African American other services it provides are used by the heavily Asian population of the Ingleside neighborhood.

== History ==
The church was founded in 1907 and became predominantly white during the 1920s. The current building at 1345 Ocean Avenue was completed in 1922 and was given to the congregation by Joseph Leonard, who developed nearby properties. Following the Second World War, the demographics of the congregation shifted, and its members were predominantly black. Roland Gordon became the church's pastor in 1978 when there were only four parishioners. He went on to rebuild the congregation and transformed it into one of the strongest African American churches in San Francisco. In late 2016, the San Francisco Board of Supervisors named Ingleside Presbyterian Church a historic landmark.

As of 2017, the number of parishioners was fewer than 60. Congregants for Sunday sermon remain predominantly African American, but that participants in the church's outreach programs such as its food bank and elderly self-help program are approximately 90% Asian. The population in the neighborhood around the church has seen similar demographic trends, being 60% black at one point, shifting to 60% Chinese.

== Murals ==
In an attempt to attract more young people to Ingleside Presbyterian Church, Roland Gordon sought to reach young African Americans through imagery. The church has a collection of paintings and pictures that depict predominantly African American subjects from history. Gordon refers to it as the Great Cloud of Witnesses. These pictures and painting cover the church's interior. The first picture in the collection was of Muhammad Ali, which Gordon put on the wall of the church's basketball gym while he was still in seminary.

== See also ==
- List of San Francisco Designated Landmarks
