= Goodman Building (San Francisco) =

Historic building in San Francisco

- U.S. National Register of Historic Places
- California Historical Landmark
- San Francisco Designated Landmark
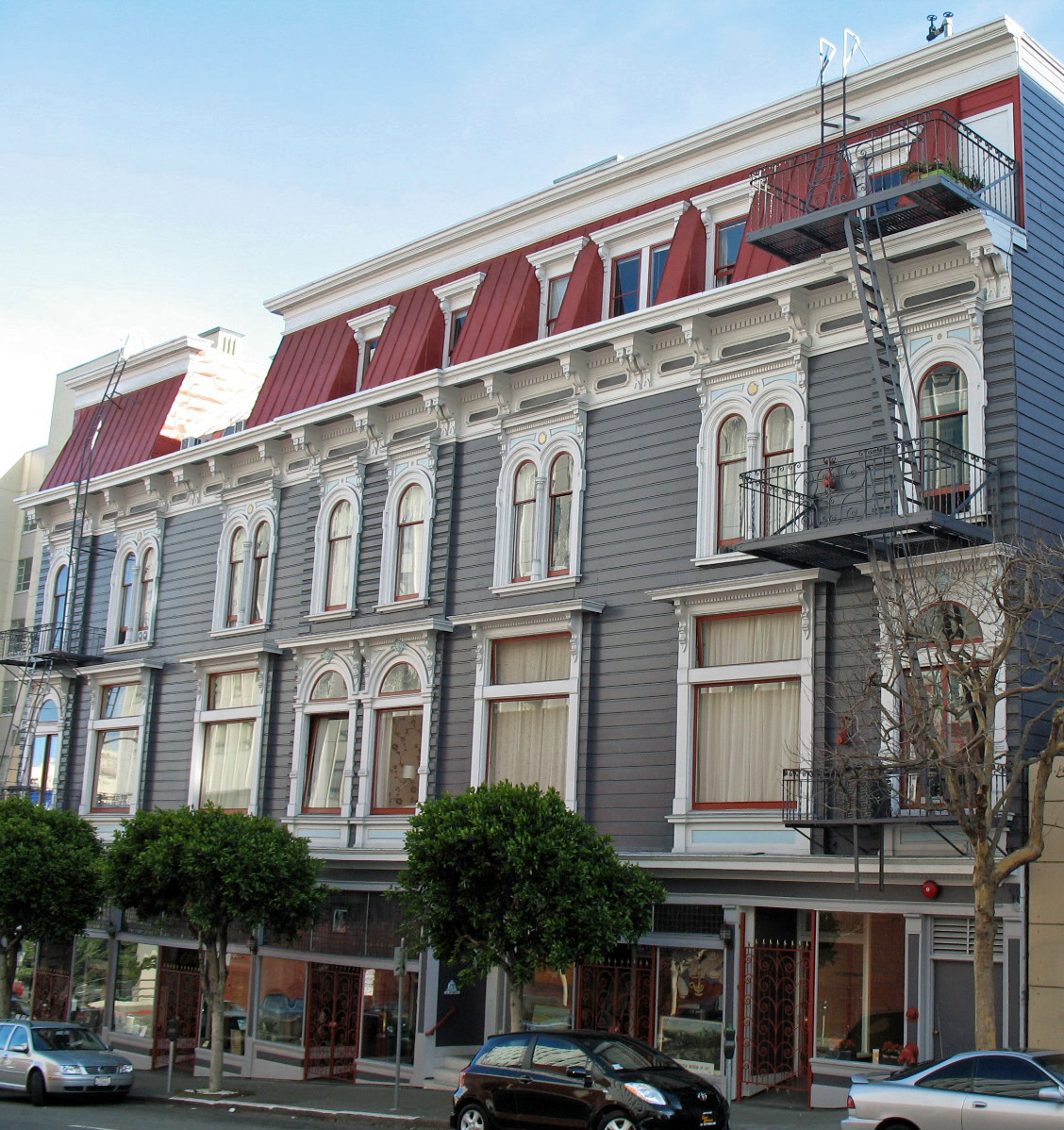

- Location within San Francisco County Location within California
- Location: 1117 Geary Boulevard, San Francisco, California, U.S.
- Coordinates: 37°47′08″N 122°25′15″W
- Area: 0.3 acres (0.12 ha)
- Built: 1869
- Architects: Joseph Emeric, Conrad A. Meussdorffer
- Architectural style: Italianate
- NRHP reference No.: 75000473
- CHISL No.: N371
- SFDL No.: 71

Significant dates
- Added to NRHP: June 18, 1975
- Designated CHISL: June 18, 1975
- Designated SFDL: February 28, 1975

Goodman Building, also known as the Emeric Building and the St. Beryl Hotel, is a historic commercial and residential building, built in 1860 and located at 1117 Geary Boulevard in Cathedral Hill, San Francisco, California.

The building is listed as a San Francisco Designated Landmark since February 28, 1975, for the historical cultural value as it was an artist community and not for architectural significance.

== History ==
The building was built around 1860 for French-born Joseph Emeric, possibly as four shorter Victorian houses. The first floor has served as space for small retail shops, in the early years often shops for craftspeople. In 1899 or 1900, the building was sold to Abraham and Sarah Goodman of New York City, who remodeled the building after purchase.

After the 1906 San Francisco earthquake and fire there was a housing shortage and as a result the building was expanded and turned into a residential hotel (or single room occupancy). It is possible it was two Victorians combined around 1906, but there are a lack of records. After World War II, the building was residence for many returning G.I.s.

In the 1960s and early 1970s, the building became home to the artist commune known as the Goodman Group. Notable artists connected to the building included, photographer H. Pierre Smith around 1908, poster artist Wes Wilson in the 1960s, and singer Janis Joplin in the 1960s.

In 1973, the San Francisco Redevelopment Agency purchased the building, and then proceeded to try to evict all of the residents, in order to tear down the building and eventually replace it with a more modern structure. In the 1970s and 1980s, Martha Senger served as a lead in the fight against eviction, alongside Charles Turner, John Campbell, Brad Paul, and others. For 10 years the residents fought the eviction. In 1983, 25 residents were evicted, some stayed locally and others moved.

Martha Senger led Artspace Development Corp. to created "Goodman 2" arts complex; which included fundraising US$3.5 million and building the new residential building in Potrero Hill (18th and Wisconsin Streets) which was completed in 1996.

== See also ==
- List of San Francisco Designated Landmarks
- National Register of Historic Places listings in San Francisco
