= Sylvester House =

Historic house in San Francisco

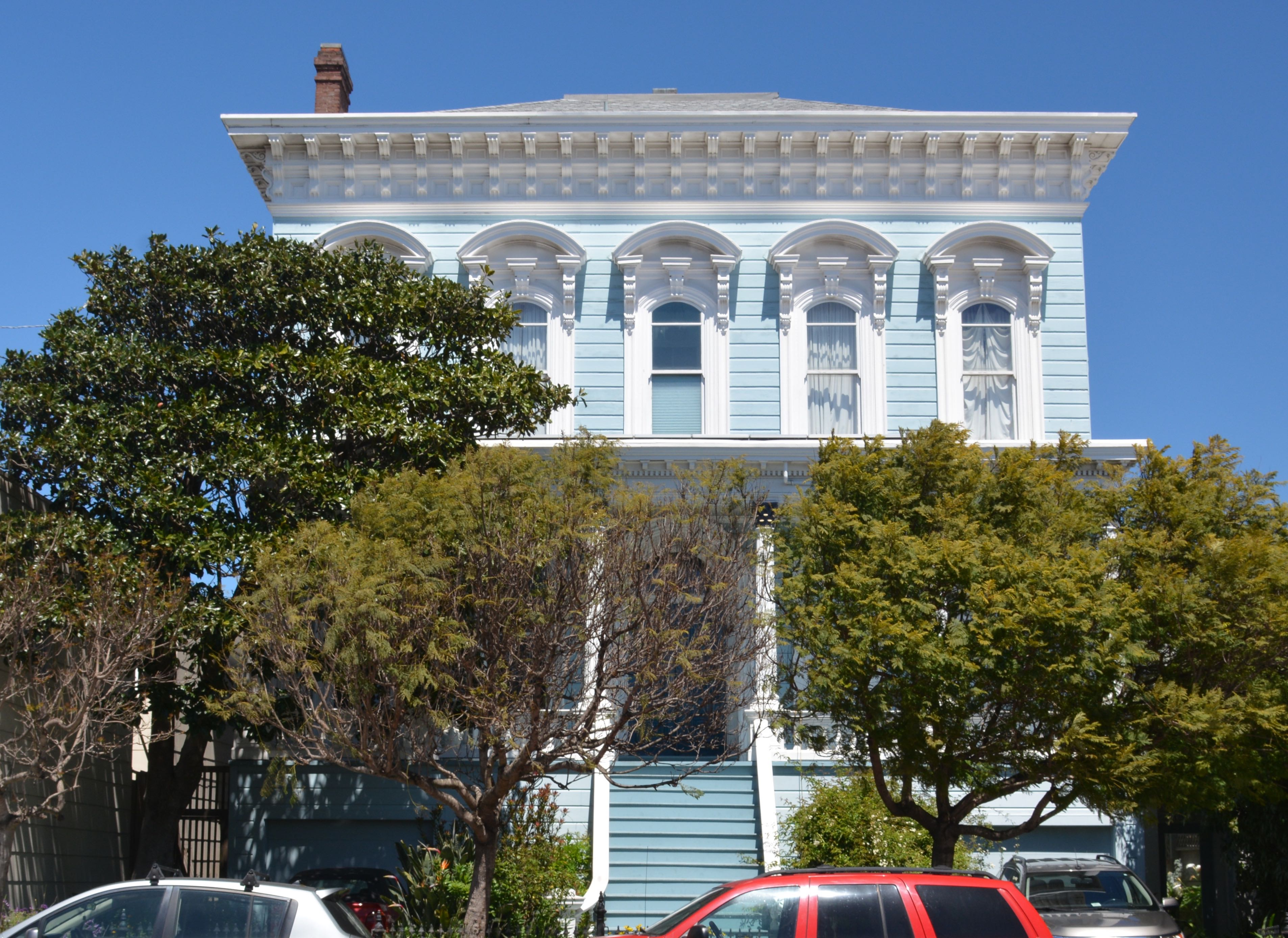

- Location within San Francisco County Location within California
- 37.731523°N 122.389136°W
- Location: 1556 Revere Avenue, San Francisco, California, 94124, U.S.

History
- Built: between 1865 and 1870
- Built for: Daniel Sylvester, Maria Sylvester

Site notes
- Architect: Stephen L. Piper
- Architectural style: Italianete

San Francisco Designated Landmark
- Designated: April 5, 1974
- Reference no.: 61

Sylvester House is a historic house, begun in 1865 and completed c. 1870 in the Bayview–Hunters Point neighborhood of San Francisco, California. The Sylvester House has been listed as a San Francisco Designated Landmark since April 5, 1974.

== History ==
This three-story house, located at located at 1556 Revere Avenue, San Francisco, was built between 1865 and 1870, by local master builder and carpenter Stephen L. Piper. Piper also constructed the nearby Bayview Opera House, c. 1883. It was designed in the Italianate style, with a symmetrical, flat front façade and features a full-width front porch. The original building featured a side wraparound porch on the East facade, a widow's walk and upper-gallery balustrades at the second-floor walk-out porch.

The Sylvester House was originally located on Quesada Avenue (then called Sumatra Street), and was relocated downhill from the original site in 1913 to its present location on Revere Avenue. When this home was built, the surrounding area was rural land; the home was surrounded by grazing land and several outbuildings. The area was then considered part of South San Francisco. Newer grid patterned streets replaced the original country lanes between 1907 and 1912, with the former 18th Avenue renamed Revere Avenue.

The home was built for Maria (née) Donnelly and Daniel Sylvester (a native of Hesse, Germany), and the Sylvester family's eight children. It was occupied from 1884 to 1900 by their children, Daniel and John Sylvester, who were wholesale meat butchers and cattle dealers in what was then known as Butchertown (now Bayview–Hunters Point).

== See also ==
- List of San Francisco Designated Landmarks
