= Takahashi Trading Company =

Building in San Francisco, California, U.S.

Takahashi Trading Company Building
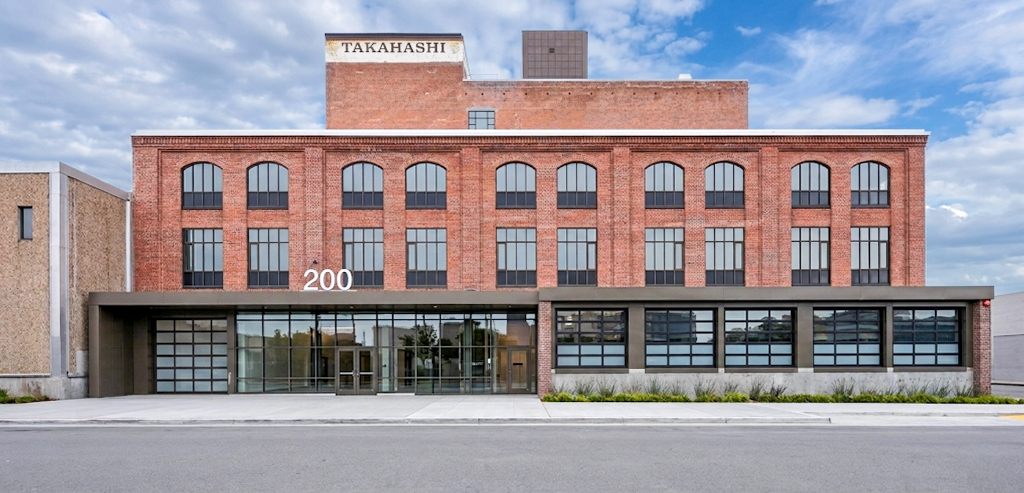

- Location within San Francisco County
- 37.766983°N 122.402994°W
- Location: 200 Rhode Island Street, San Francisco, California, U.S.

History
- Built: 1912

Site notes
- Architect: Gustave Albert Lansburgh

San Francisco Designated Landmark
- Designated: September 22, 2022
- Reference no.: 305

Takahashi Trading Company is a former Japanese-import home goods retail and wholesale business in the United States, and is the name of a 1912 warehouse building that once housed the business headquarters in the Potrero Hill neighborhood in San Francisco, California, U.S.. The business was active from 1945 until 2019, and had various retail locations nationwide. It was founded by the Japanese–American couple, Henri Takahashi and Tomoye "Tami" Takahashi.

Since 2022, the warehouse building has been listed by the city as a San Francisco Designated Landmark.

== Architecture of 200 Rhode Island Street ==
The five-story brick warehouse building was designed in 1912 by architect G. Albert Lansburgh for H. Levi & Co. It has a trapezoidal floor plan, designed to fit in the triangular parcel. It once abutted a former Western Pacific Railroad track that bisected the block.

In 1965, the 200 Rhode Island Street building became the Takahashi Trading Company.

== History of the Takahashi Trading Company ==
During World War II (c. 1945), Henri Takahashi (1915–2002) and Tomoye "Tami" Takahashi (née Nozawa; 1915–2016) were forced into an internment camp at the Topaz War Relocation Center. While incarcerated they imagined creating an import home goods store.

After the war in 1945, the Takahashi Trading Company opened on 1661–1663 Post Street in San Francisco's Japantown. It started as a small dry goods store and wholesaler. Many of the Japanese items imported to the United States for the business were handcrafted, or of high quality including folk arts and crafts, origami materials, tea ceremony accessories, baskets, and musical instruments. As a form of community service they obtained an export license to send care packages and pharmaceuticals to post-war Japan for the next 10 years.

In 1959 the San Francisco Redevelopment Agency seized their Post Street property, which was demolished to create the Japan Center mall (built 1962–1968). The Takahashi Trading Company moved the warehouse to 200 Rhode Island Street in 1965. At their peak they had retail stores nationwide, including at 57th Street in New York City; Bridgeway in Sausalito, California; Grant Avenue at the corner of Geary Boulevard in Downtown San Francisco; and in Ghirardelli Square in San Francisco. Tomoye’s sister Masako Martha Suzuki joined the business and helped with the business operations. The business occupied the 200 Rhode Island Street building until 2019, a few years after the death of Tomoyo.

From 1985 to 2016, the Takahashis operated the Henri and Tomoye Takahashi Charitable Foundation, which supported numerous nonprofits in the United States that encouraged an understanding of Japanese culture and arts.

== See also ==
- List of San Francisco Designated Landmarks
