= Sydney Walton Square =

Public park in San Francisco, California

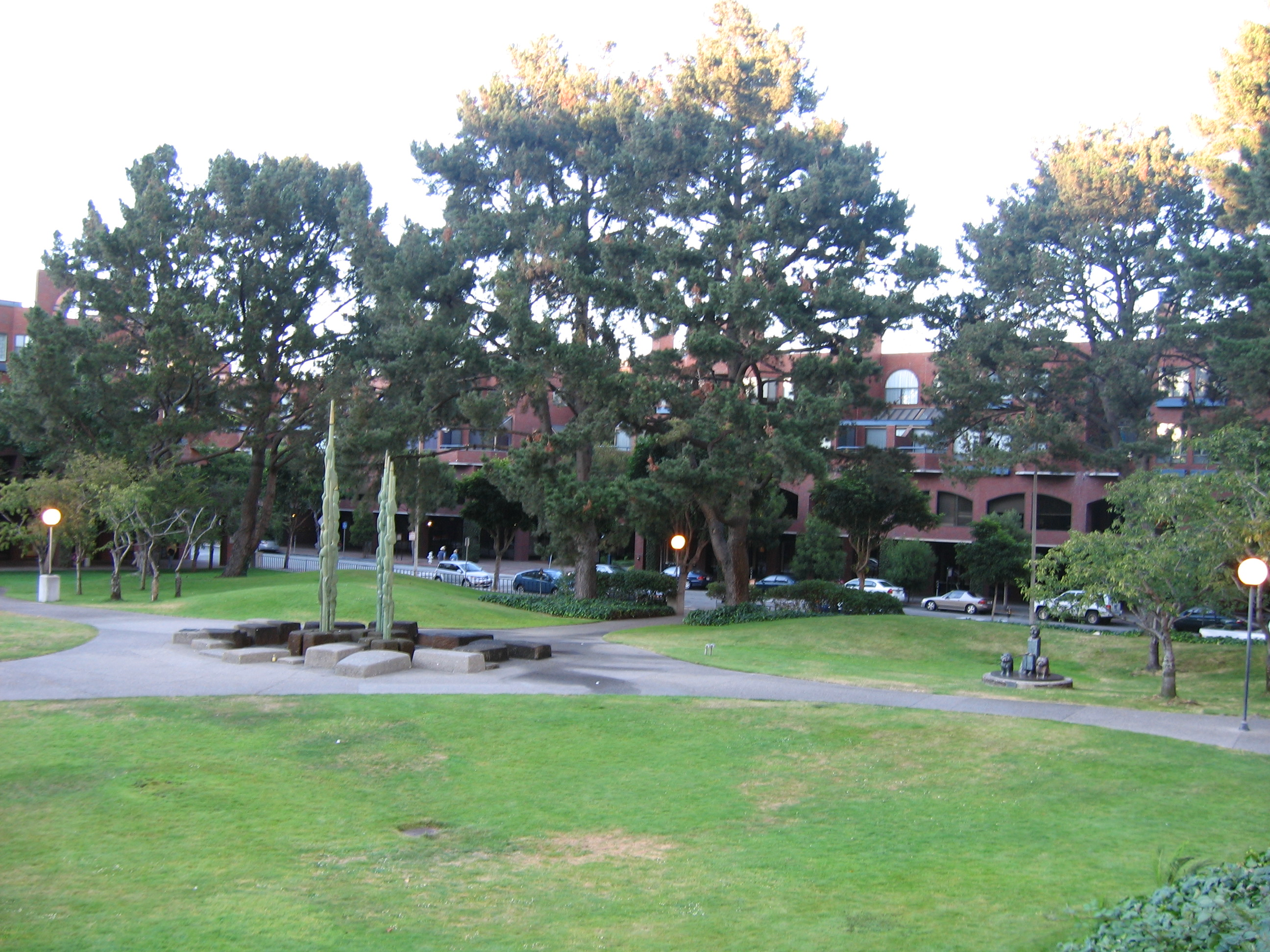
- View from Sydney Walton Square
- Interactive map of Sydney Walton Square
- Location: San Francisco, California, United States
- Coordinates: 37.79751°N 122.39902°W

Sydney Walton Square is a hybrid public and private park located just west of the Embarcadero in San Francisco, California, United States. The park is named after San Francisco's Sydney Grant Walton, a banker and former vice chairman of the San Francisco Redevelopment Agency.

== History ==
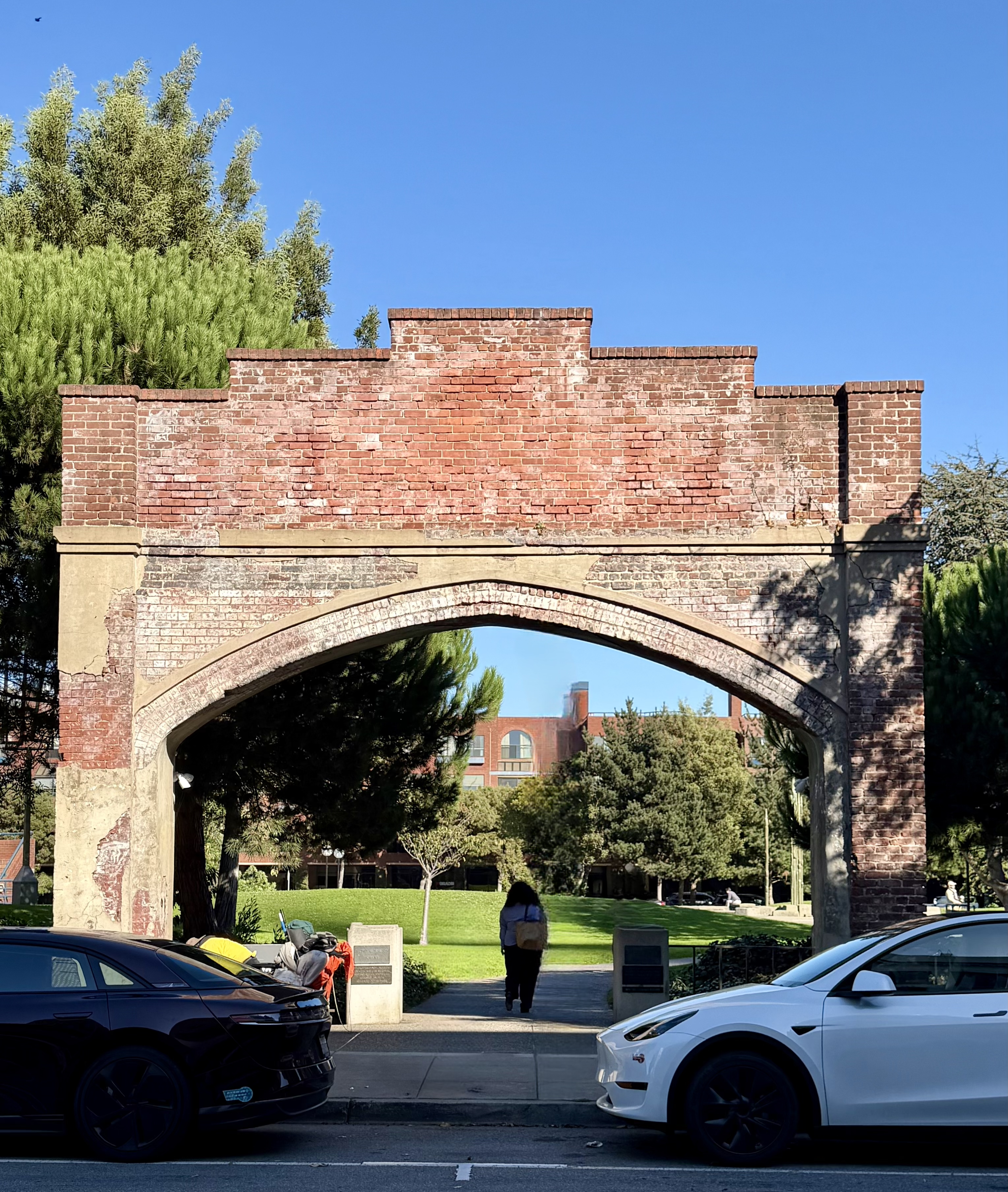
Colombo Market Arch at Sydney Walton Square

The 2-acre park was designed by Peter Walker. It was created as part of the city of San Francisco's partnership with Golden Gateway Center, to bring more public art to the area and planned as a combine residential, retail, commercial, and open space. In the 1960s it was part of the Golden Gateway redevelopment project led by the San Francisco Redevelopment Agency.

=== Public art ===
The park consists of various public artwork, including Jim Dine's Big Heart on the Rock (1974), Marisol Escobar's Portrait of Georgia O'Keeffe (1982), George Rickey's Two Open Rectangles (1977), Joan Brown's Pine Tree Obelisk (1987), Benny Bufano's The Penguins, and Francois Stahly's Fountain of Four Seasons (1962).

=== Colombo Market Arch ===
An old arch from the Colombo Market also resides in the park. It is the only remaining structure from San Francisco's historical produce district. The Colombo Market was founded in 1874 as the main produce market for the city, with fruits and vegetables brought in the early mornings by horse-drawn vehicles. After 1920, growers began shipping produce all over the United States; and by the 1950s, the market and surrounding area was in a decline and had a rat problem. This was one of the early projects by the San Francisco Redevelopment Agency. The Colombo Market Arch was left onsite as a gateway to the park, and listed as one of the San Francisco Designated Landmarks (no. 311).
