= Medico-Dental Building (San Francisco) =

Historic building in San Francisco, California

- Location: 441 Jackson Street, San Francisco, California, U.S.
- Coordinates: 37.7965°N, 122.4030°W
- Built: c. 1861
- Architectural style: Italianate; Gold Rush–era brick commercial
- Construction: Heavy brick masonry with iron shutters on recessed bays
- Part of: Jackson Square Historic District (NRHP #71000186)

San Francisco Designated Landmark
- Designated: February 3, 1969
- Reference no.: 10

The Medico-Dental Building is a historic commercial building located at 441 Jackson Street, east of Hotaling Place, in the Jackson Square Historic District of San Francisco, California. Built circa 1861, it is among the oldest surviving commercial structures in the city and was designated San Francisco Designated Landmark No. 14 on February 3, 1969. Despite its name, the building's connection with the medical profession is not known according to its landmark designation report; it was long used as a coffee, wine, and tobacco warehouse, and there is no evidence of physicians' offices on the premises.

== History ==
The Medico-Dental Building was constructed circa 1861, during the period when the area now known as Jackson Square served as San Francisco's primary commercial and warehousing district along the early waterfront. The dismantled hulls of two abandoned Gold Rush schooners were used in the construction of the building, a practice characteristic of the Jackson Square area, which was partially built on landfill made from abandoned ships left in Yerba Buena Cove during the Gold Rush.

The building's first known tenant was F. Daneri & Co., an importer of wine and liquors, and the structure was long used as a warehouse for coffee, wine, and tobacco. The origin of the building's "Medico-Dental" name remains undocumented; according to the landmark designation report, the connection with the medical profession is not known, and there is no evidence of physicians' offices on the premises. The only physical reference to medicine on the building consists of decorative ornamentation on the facade.

After 1870, as the business district moved south and west, many buildings in the Jackson Square area lost their more distinguished occupants, with a shift from professional and retail tenants to manufacturing and wholesaling - including liquor and tobacco dealers, cigar factories, leather works, and later printing and paper warehousing - a trend that continued through the early decades of the 1900s.

The building survived the 1906 San Francisco earthquake and fire, which destroyed most of the city's pre-1906 building stock; the Jackson Square area is notable as one of the few downtown enclaves where a substantial concentration of pre-earthquake commercial buildings remains intact.

In 1933, the building was documented by the Historic American Buildings Survey (HABS) under the designation HABS CA-1902, with photographic and caption material now held by the Library of Congress; the HABS record identifies the property as the "Jackson Square Commercial Building, 441 Jackson Street."

During Jackson Square's renaissance in the 1950s, the building was converted into interior decorator showrooms, reflecting the broader transformation of the district during that decade.

== Architecture ==
The Medico-Dental Building is an Italianate brick commercial building characteristic of the Classical Revival and Italianate brick-and-cast-iron-storefront architecture that defines the Jackson Square Historic District. Like other buildings of the same era on its block, it is of heavy brick construction and fitted with iron shutters on recessed bays - a form of "fireproofing" employed during the Gold Rush, when regular conflagrations made the infant city a tinderbox and necessitated such preventative designs.

=== Caducei and ornamental detail ===
The ornamentation on the building's pilasters is more elaborate than ordinary, with shields cast into them at midpoint, and atop each pilaster is a caduceus - an ancient Greek or Roman herald's wand with entwined serpents traditionally associated with healing. The caducei constitute the building's only known physical association with the medical profession, although the connection has not been explained in the landmark designation report. San Francisco Heritage has speculated that, given the building's first known tenant was an importer of wine and liquor, the symbols may have been a nod to changing fashions on how to live a healthy life, though it acknowledges this is a stretch.

== Designation and protection ==
On February 3, 1969, the San Francisco Board of Supervisors designated the building as City Landmark No. 14 under Article 10 of the Planning Code, identifying it by its assessor's parcel as block 196, lot 21. The Medico-Dental Building is also a contributing resource to the Jackson Square Historic District, which was listed on the National Register of Historic Places on November 18, 1971 (NRHP reference #71000186), and which constitutes San Francisco's first locally designated historic district.
