= Old St. Patrick's Church (San Francisco) =

Historic building in California, US

Old St. Patrick's Church Holy Cross Parish Hall
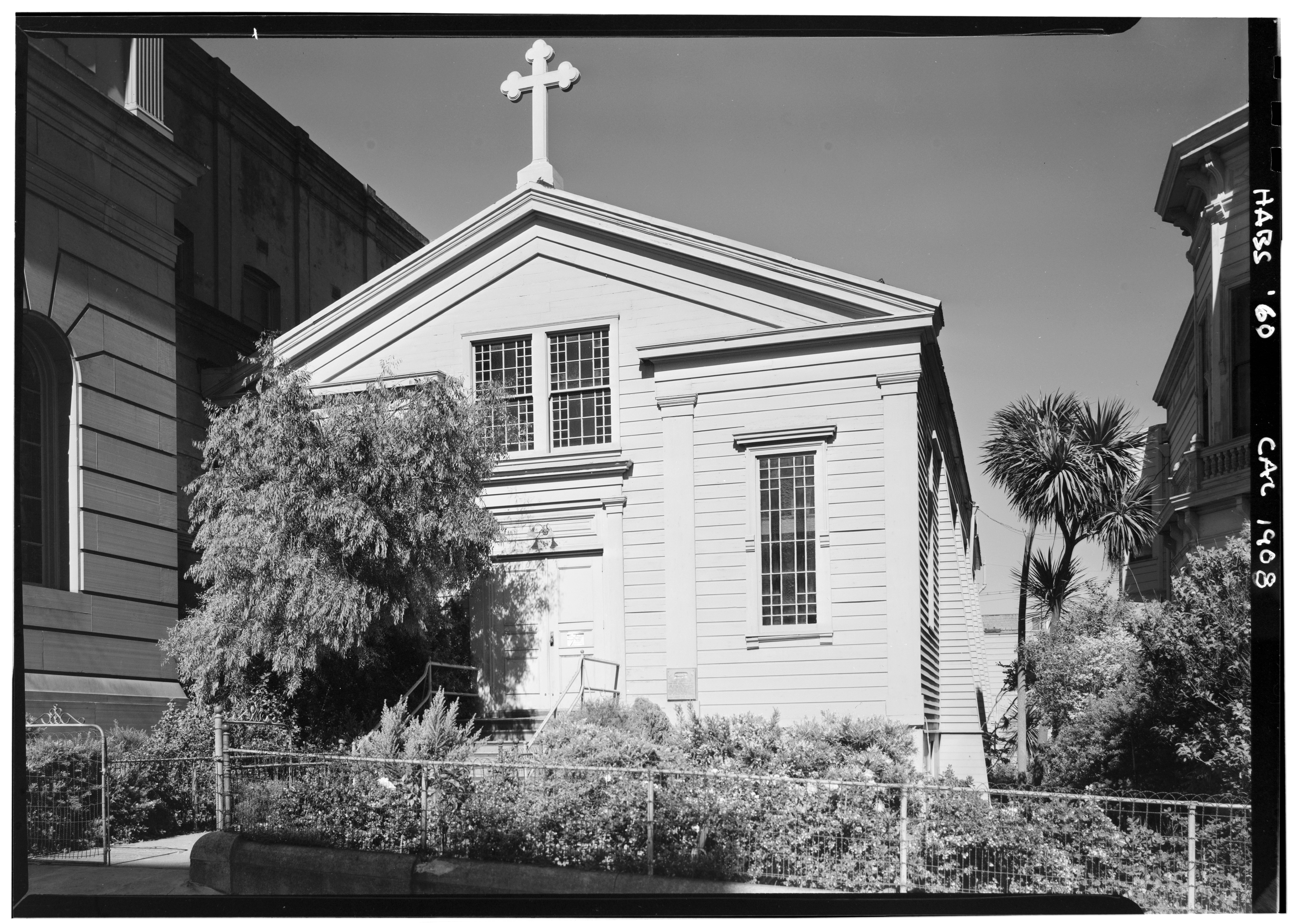
- Old St. Patrick's Church in 1960
- Interactive map of Old St. Patrick's Church; Holy Cross Parish Hall
- Location: 1820 Eddy Street, San Francisco, California, U.S.
- Coordinates: 37.781712°N 122.438076°W
- Built: 1854; 172 years ago

San Francisco Designated Landmark
- Designated: September 3, 1968
- Reference no.: 6

California Historical Landmark
- Designated: December 11, 1968
- Reference no.: P109

Old St. Patrick's Church, also known as Holy Cross Parish Hall, is a historic church building, located in the Western Addition neighborhood of San Francisco, California, U.S. It is the oldest frame church building in the city. It is a San Francisco Designated Landmark since September 3, 1968, is listed as a California Historical Landmark since December 11, 1968, and contains a historical marker erected by Native Daughters of the Golden West.

== History ==
The wood frame church was built for the Parish of St. Patrick's Catholic Church in 1854 at Market Street between Second and Third Streets in the neighborhood once called Happy Valley (present location of the Palace Hotel in the Financial District).

The building was moved in 1873 to Eddy Street and was used by the Parish of Saint John the Baptist Church. It was moved again in 1891 to its present location at 1820 Eddy Street and was used by the Parish of Holy Cross until 1899. After 1899 it was used as parish hall. The building is now located next to the Macang Monastery complex, a Buddhist temple.

== See also ==
- List of San Francisco Designated Landmarks
