= Abner Phelps House =

Historic house in California, United States

- U.S. National Register of Historic Places
- San Francisco Designated Landmark
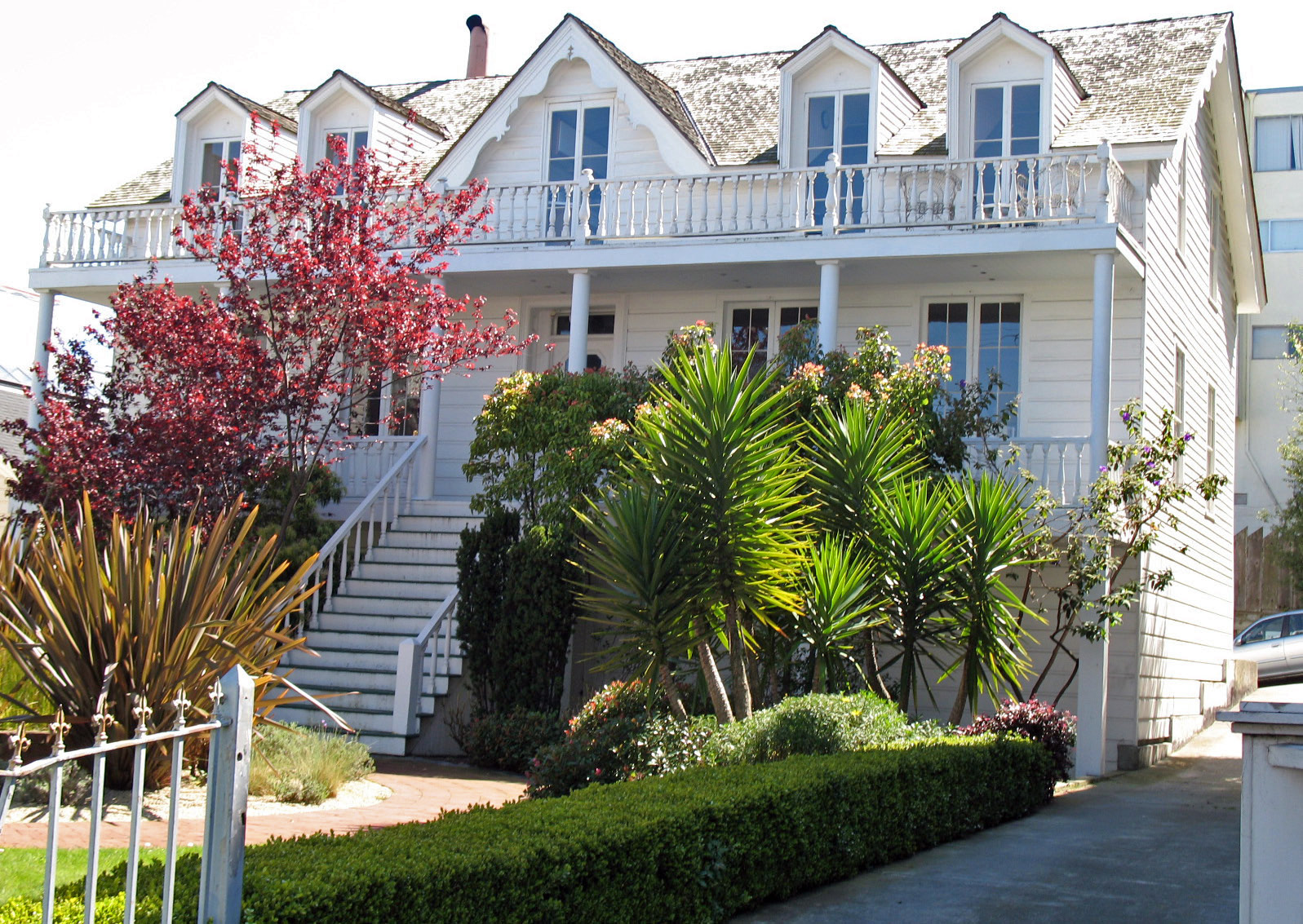
- Abner Phelps House in San Francisco

- Location within San Francisco County Location within California Location within the United States
- Location: 1111 Oak Street, San Francisco, California
- Coordinates: 37°46′22″N 122°26′17″W
- Area: 0.1 acres (0.040 ha)
- Built: c. 1850
- Architectural style: Colonial
- NRHP reference No.: 71000187
- SFDL No.: 32

Significant dates
- Added to NRHP: 23 May 1979
- Designated SFDL: 31 May 1970

The Abner Phelps House is one of the oldest private residences in San Francisco, constructed in approximately 1850 by Abner Phelps and his wife Augusta Roussell with pre-constructed house parts. It is located at 1111 Oak Street just west of Divisadero Street in San Francisco's Haight Ashbury district. The house is not open to the public, and as of 2019 is the location of a private business.

The building is listed on the National Register of Historic Places since May 23, 1979; and is listed as a San Francisco Designated Landmark (number 32), since May 31, 1970.

== History ==
Abner Phelps served in the Mexican–American War as a colonel from 1846 to 1848 and later worked as a lawyer on Montgomery Street. He rode a horse to his office, which stood where the Transamerica Pyramid currently is located. By 1854, the San Francisco city borders extended to the property. The architecture style of the house is a reference to Gothic Revival with Colonial features.

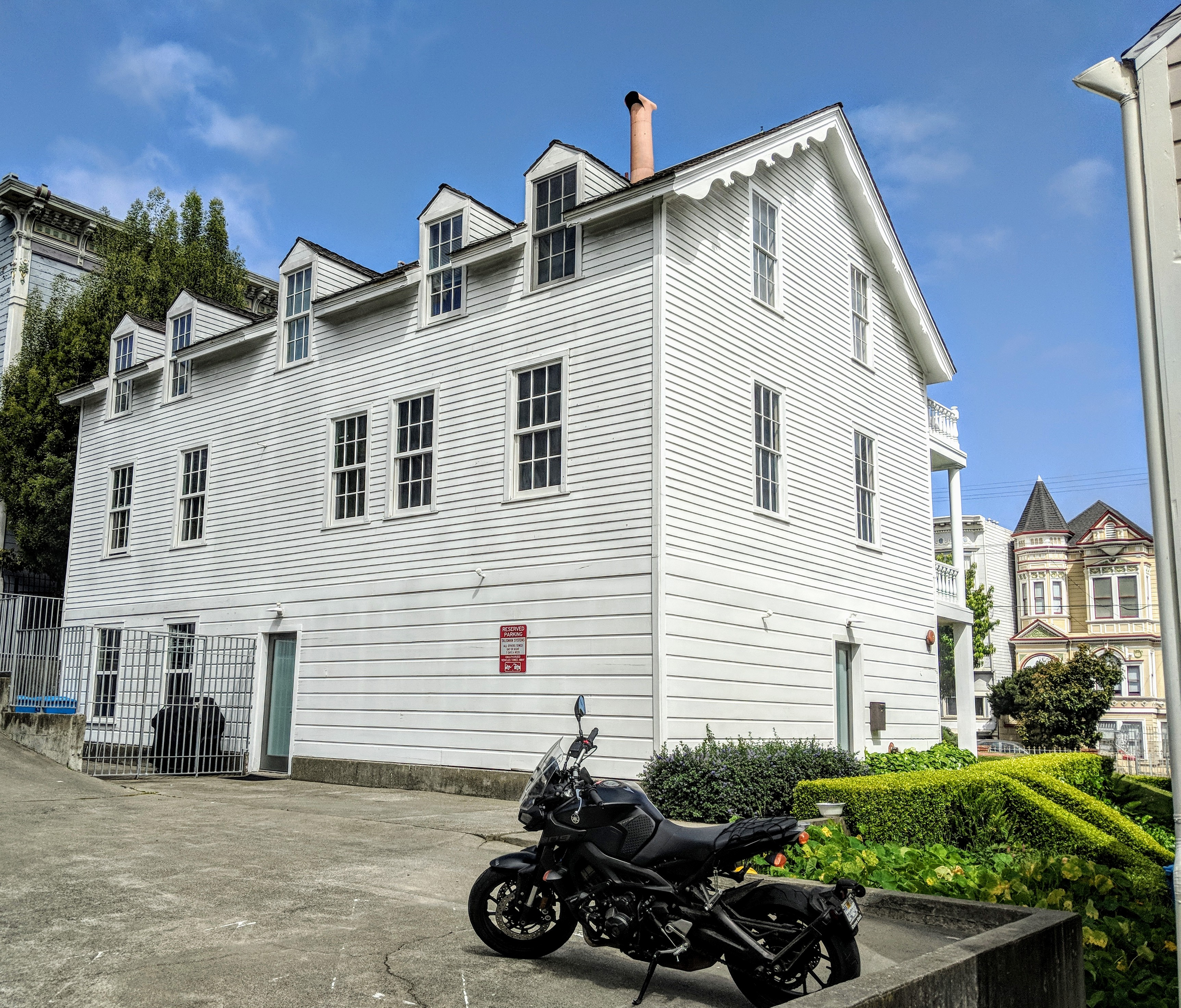
Rear view of the Abner Phelps House

The building has moved three times; once in 1890 for the road grading on Divisadero Street and then repositioned in the same place, secondly in 1904 to reposition the house so that stores could be built along Divisadero and in the 1970s it was repositioned on the lot to allow for a front yard. It previously had the address 329 Divisadero Street.

=== Origins ===
The origins of the house has two contradicting stories. The oldest published story of the origins is from 1934, "built in 1850 by John Middleton & Sons, one of the first real estate concerns in the city...(and) constructed of lumber into sections brought round the Horn from Maine, there being no sawmills here at the time." The second story is from 1961, Phelps' great-granddaughter stated the house was built in New Orleans and brought in sections and rebuilt in San Francisco between 1850 and 1851, this was because his wife Roussell was homesick for Louisiana. The home sat on a 160-acre homestead outside of San Francisco and included the area that is now the Golden Gate Park Panhandle.

== See also ==
- List of San Francisco Designated Landmarks
