= National Register of Historic Places listings in San Francisco =

Location of San Francisco in California

This is intended to be a complete list of the properties and districts on the National Register of Historic Places in San Francisco, California, United States. Latitude and longitude coordinates are provided for many National Register properties and districts; these locations may be seen together in an online map.

There are 211 properties and districts listed on the National Register in the city, including 18 National Historic Landmarks. Another three properties were once listed but have been removed.

This National Park Service list is complete through NPS recent listings posted November 6, 2026.

== Color markings (highest noted listing) ==
	NRHP-listed
^{∞}	NRHP-listed Historic district
*	National Historic Landmark and NRHP-listed
^{∞}	National Historic Landmark and NRHP-listed Historic district

== Current listings ==
	Name on the Register	Image	Date listed	Location	Neighborhood/Region	Description
1	Administration Building, Treasure Island	Administration Building, Treasure Island	February 26, 2008 (#08000081)	Southeast corner of Avenue of the Palms and California Ave. 37°49′02″N 122°22′16″W	Treasure Island	Treasure Island Museum Association
2	Alberta Candy Factory		September 22, 2021 (#100006997)	555 19th St. 37°45′42″N 122°23′18″W	Dogpatch	
3	Alcatraz	Alcatraz	June 23, 1976 (#76000209)	Alcatraz Island, San Francisco Bay; 37°49′36″N 122°25′22″W	San Francisco Bay	Former maximum security Federal prison, from which Frank Morris but few others escaped, now part of the Golden Gate National Recreation Area and visited by tourist ferries.
4	ALMA (Scow Schooner)	ALMA (Scow Schooner)	October 10, 1975 (#75000179)	Hyde Street Pier, San Francisco Maritime National Historical Park, 2905 Hyde Street; 37°48′37″N 122°25′22″W	Fisherman's Wharf	Flat-bottomed scow schooner built in 1891 to haul goods on and around San Francisco Bay and river delta areas.
5	Apollo (Storeship)	Apollo (Storeship)	May 16, 1991 (#91000561)	NW corner of Sacramento and Battery Sts. 37°47′39″N 122°24′02″W	Financial District	San Francisco History: Buried Ships
6	Aquatic Park Historic District	Aquatic Park Historic District	January 26, 1984 (#84001183)	Bounded by Van Ness Ave., Hyde and Polk Sts. 37°48′25″N 122°25′22″W	Fisherman's Wharf	Streamline Moderne building built as a public bathhouse by the WPA in 1936. Also a National Historic Landmark.
7	Armour & Co. Building	Armour & Co. Building	December 22, 2009 (#09001117)	1050 Battery St. 37°48′04″N 122°24′05″W	Fisherman's Wharf	1907 building by San Francisco architect Henry Geilfuss used as a meat packing plant and smokehouse by Armour and Company until 1934
8	Atherton House	Atherton House	January 31, 1979 (#79000527)	1990 California St. 37°47′24″N 122°25′38″W	Lower Pacific Heights	NoeHill of San Francisco listing for Atherton House.
9	Audiffred Building	Audiffred Building	May 10, 1979 (#79000528)	1–21 Mission St. 37°47′36″N 122°23′33″W	South Beach	1889 waterfront commercial building
10	Baker and Hamilton	Baker and Hamilton	February 9, 2005 (#05000001)	601 Townsend St. 37°46′17″N 122°24′07″W	South of Market	
11	Balclutha	Balclutha	November 7, 1976 (#76000178)	Pier 41 East; 37°48′35″N 122°25′21″W	Fisherman's Wharf	1886 square rigged sailing ship
12	Bank of Italy	Bank of Italy	June 2, 1978 (#78000754)	552 Montgomery St. 37°47′41″N 122°24′11″W	Financial District	
13	Beach Chalet	Beach Chalet	July 22, 1981 (#81000172)	1000 Great Hwy. 37°46′10″N 122°30′37″W	Ocean Beach	
14	C. A. Belden House	C. A. Belden House	August 11, 1983 (#83001229)	2004–2010 Gough St. 37°47′32″N 122°25′33″W	Pacific Heights	
15	Bellaire Tower		September 29, 2026 (#100013453)	1101 Green Street; 37°47′54″N 122°25′03″W		
16	Belt Railroad Engine House and Sandhouse	Belt Railroad Engine House and Sandhouse	February 13, 1986 (#86000207)	Block bounded by Lombard, Sansome, and the Embarcadero; 37°48′17″N 122°24′12″W	Fisherman's Wharf	
17	Bethlehem Shipbuilding Corporation Hospital		December 29, 2022 (#100008498)	331 Pennsylvania Ave. 37°45′44″N 122°23′37″W	Potrero Hill	
18	Building at 1735–1737 Webster Street	Building at 1735–1737 Webster Street	March 8, 1973 (#73000444)	1735–1737 Webster St. 37°47′13″N 122°25′55″W	Lower Pacific Heights	Stick-Eastlake house, known also as "Vollmer House", which was moved to its current location from 773 Turk St. in 1973.
19	Building at 1813–1813B Sutter Street	Building at 1813–1813B Sutter Street	March 8, 1973 (#73000443)	1815 Sutter St. 37°47′11″N 122°25′50″W	Japantown	
20	Building at 1840–1842 Eddy Street	Building at 1840–1842 Eddy Street	March 8, 1973 (#73000437)	1840–1842 Eddy St. 37°46′51″N 122°26′20″W	Western Addition	
21	Building at 33–35 Beideman Place	Building at 33–35 Beideman Place	March 8, 1973 (#73000435)	33–35 Beideman Pl. 37°46′56″N 122°26′19″W	Western Addition	
22	Building at 45–47 Beideman Place	Building at 45–47 Beideman Place	March 8, 1973 (#73000436)	45–57 Beideman Pl. 37°46′56″N 122°26′19″W	Western Addition	
23	Building at 465 Tenth St.	Building at 465 Tenth St.	June 4, 1999 (#99000581)	465 Tenth St. 37°46′15″N 122°24′36″W	South of Market	Rothschild Building
24	Building at 735 Market Street	Building at 735 Market Street	July 27, 2004 (#04000327)	735 Market St. 37°47′12″N 122°24′15″W	Financial District	
25	Buon Gusto Sausage Factory	Buon Gusto Sausage Factory	February 1, 2021 (#100006073)	535 Green St. 37°47′59″N 122°24′29″W		
26	Burr House	Burr House	June 8, 2015 (#14000967)	1772 Vallejo St. 37°47′47″N 122°25′35″W	Pacific Heights	
27	Bush Street–Cottage Row Historic District	Bush Street–Cottage Row Historic District	December 27, 1982 (#82000983)	2101–2125 Bush St., 1–6 Cottage Row, and 1940–1948 Sutter St. 37°47′12″N 122°25′56″W	Lower Pacific Heights	
28	C. A. Thayer	C. A. Thayer	November 13, 1966 (#66000229)	San Francisco Maritime State Historic Park; 37°48′33″N 122°25′18″W	Fisherman's Wharf	1895 schooner
29	Calvary Presbyterian Church	Calvary Presbyterian Church	May 3, 1978 (#78000755)	2501–2515 Fillmore St. 37°47′34″N 122°26′05″W	Pacific Heights	
30	Camera Obscura	Camera Obscura	May 23, 2001 (#01000522)	1096 Point Lobos Ave. 37°46′42″N 122°30′51″W	Richmond District	
31	Central Embarcadero Piers Historic District	Central Embarcadero Piers Historic District	November 20, 2002 (#02001390)	Piers 1, 1½, 3 and 5, The Embarcadero; 37°47′51″N 122°23′44″W	Embarcadero	
32	Chambord Apartments	Chambord Apartments	September 20, 1984 (#84001184)	1298 Sacramento St. 37°47′33″N 122°24′51″W	Nob Hill	
33	City of Paris Building	City of Paris Building	January 23, 1975 (#75000471)	181–199 Geary St. 37°47′15″N 122°24′23″W	Downtown	Neiman Marcus now occupies the site of the former City of Paris Building, though its glass rotunda is preserved
34	Coffin-Redington Building	Coffin-Redington Building	February 2, 2001 (#01000028)	301 Folsom St. and 300 Beale St. 37°47′19″N 122°23′34″W	Rincon Hill	
35	Coit Memorial Tower	Coit Memorial Tower	January 29, 2008 (#07001468)	1 Telegraph Hill Blvd. 37°48′09″N 122°24′21″W	Telegraph Hill	
36	Colombo Building	Colombo Building	January 31, 2008 (#07001469)	1–21 Columbus Ave. 37°47′44″N 122°24′13″W	Financial District	
37	Compton's Cafeteria	Compton's Cafeteria	January 27, 2025 (#100008499)	101-102 Taylor St. 37°47′00″N 122°24′39″W	San Francisco	
38	USS Conestoga (shipwreck and remains)	USS Conestoga (shipwreck and remains)	June 10, 2016 (#16000358)	Greater Farallones National Marine Sanctuary	Gulf of the Farallones	
39	Dallam-Merritt House	Dallam-Merritt House	April 19, 1984 (#84001185)	2355 Washington St. 37°47′30″N 122°25′56″W	Pacific Heights	
40	Delano House	Delano House	October 29, 1982 (#82000984)	70 Buena Vista Terr. 37°46′04″N 122°26′18″W	Buena Vista	
41	Richard P. Doolan Residence and Storefronts	Richard P. Doolan Residence and Storefronts	May 11, 2011 (#09001201)	557 Ashbury St./1500-1512 Haight St. 37°46′13″N 122°26′47″W	Haight-Ashbury	
42	Drydock 4 Hunters Point Naval Shipyard	Drydock 4 Hunters Point Naval Shipyard	July 25, 2012 (#12000424)	Southeast of the junction of Spear Ave. & Morrell St. 37°43′32″N 122°21′54″W	Bayview-Hunters Point	
43	Frank G. Edwards House	Frank G. Edwards House	October 29, 1982 (#82000986)	1366 Guerrero St. 37°44′57″N 122°25′22″W	Noe Valley	
44	Engine House No. 31	Engine House No. 31	January 7, 1988 (#87002290)	1088 Green St. 37°47′55″N 122°25′01″W	Russian Hill	
45	Eureka	Eureka	April 24, 1973 (#73000229)	Hyde Street Pier, San Francisco Maritime National Historical Park, 2905 Hyde Street; 37°48′35″N 122°25′18″W	Fisherman's Wharf	1890 steam ferryboat
46	Fairmont Hotel	Fairmont Hotel	April 17, 2002 (#02000373)	950 Mason St. 37°47′33″N 122°24′38″W	Nob Hill	
47	Farallon Islands	Farallon Islands	March 8, 1977 (#77000332)	28 mi. W of San Francisco; 37°41′57″N 123°00′10″W	Gulf of the Farallones	
48	Federal Reserve Bank of San Francisco	Federal Reserve Bank of San Francisco	July 31, 1989 (#89000009)	400 Sansome St. 37°47′39″N 122°24′04″W	Financial District	
49	Ferry Station Post Office Building	Ferry Station Post Office Building	December 1, 1978 (#78000756)	Embarcadero at Mission St. 37°47′38″N 122°23′32″W	Embarcadero	
50	Feusier Octagon House	Feusier Octagon House	March 24, 1974 (#74000554)	1067 Green St. 37°47′54″N 122°25′00″W	Russian Hill	
51	Fillmore-Pine Building	Fillmore-Pine Building	January 11, 1982 (#82002247)	1946 Fillmore Street; 37°47′16″N 122°26′01″W	Lower Pacific Heights	
52	Delia Fleishhacker Memorial Building	Delia Fleishhacker Memorial Building	December 31, 1979 (#79000529)	Zoo Rd. and Sloat Blvd. 37°44′01″N 122°30′23″W	Parkside	Part of the San Francisco Zoo complex; formerly of the Fleischhacker Pool
53	James C. Flood Mansion	James C. Flood Mansion	November 13, 1966 (#66000230)	California and Mason Sts. 37°47′31″N 122°24′41″W	Nob Hill	
54	Folger Coffee Company Building	Folger Coffee Company Building	June 21, 1996 (#96000679)	101 Howard St. 37°47′28″N 122°23′33″W	South Beach	
55	Fort Mason Historic District	Fort Mason Historic District	April 25, 1972 (#72000109)	Portion of Fort Mason north and east of Franklin St. and McArthur Ave. • Boundary increase (listed April 23, 1979, refnum 79000530): Bounded by Van Ness Ave., Bay and Laguna Sts. 37°48′24″N 122°25′36″W	Fort Mason	
56	Fort Miley Military Reservation	Fort Miley Military Reservation	May 23, 1980 (#80000371)	Off CA 1; 37°46′58″N 122°30′32″W	Richmond District	
57	Fort Point National Historic Site	Fort Point National Historic Site	October 16, 1970 (#70000146)	N tip of San Francisco Peninsula on U.S. 101; 37°48′39″N 122°28′37″W	Presidio	
58	Four Fifty Sutter Building	Four Fifty Sutter Building	December 22, 2009 (#09001118)	450 Sutter St. 37°47′22″N 122°24′28″W	Union Square	
59	Frederick Griffing's (ship)	Frederick Griffing's (ship)	February 1, 1982 (#82002248)	Below Levi Plaza; 37°48′11″N 122°24′08″W	Fisherman's Wharf	Remains of buried ship at former wharf of Frederick Griffings discovered in 1978. Still buried under Levi Plaza fountain.
60	Fuller Company Glass Warehouse	Fuller Company Glass Warehouse	October 11, 2001 (#01001101)	50 Green St. 37°48′03″N 122°24′02″W	Fisherman's Wharf	
61	Geary Theatre	Geary Theatre	May 27, 1975 (#75000472)	415 Geary St. 37°47′13″N 122°24′37″W	Downtown	
62	Henry Geilfuss House	Henry Geilfuss House	July 24, 2017 (#100001338)	811 Treat Ave. 37°45′25″N 122°24′47″W	Mission District	
63	Geneva Office Building and Power House	Geneva Office Building and Power House	March 31, 2010 (#10000111)	2301 San Jose Ave. 37°43′15″N 122°26′47″W	Excelsior	
64	Daniel Gibb & Co. Warehouse	Daniel Gibb & Co. Warehouse	October 10, 1997 (#97001189)	855 Front St., and 101 Vallejo St. 37°47′58″N 122°24′01″W	Fisherman's Wharf	
65	Girls Club	Girls Club	November 6, 1979 (#79000531)	362 Capp St. 37°45′40″N 122°25′06″W	Mission District	
66	Glen Park BART Station	Glen Park BART Station	October 21, 2019 (#100004531)	2901 Diamond St. 37°43′59″N 122°26′02″W		
67	Glide Memorial Church	Glide Memorial Church	March 14, 2022 (#100007488)	330, 302 Ellis St. 37°47′06″N 122°24′41″W	Tenderloin	
68	Golden Gate Park	Golden Gate Park	October 15, 2004 (#04001137)	Bounded by Fulton St., Stanyan St., Fell St., Baker St., Oak St., Lincoln Way and The Great Highway; 37°46′09″N 122°29′01″W	Golden Gate Park	
69	Golden Gate Park Conservatory	Golden Gate Park Conservatory	October 14, 1971 (#71000184)	Mount Link, N of John F. Kennedy Dr. at E end of Golden Gate Park; 37°46′21″N 122°27′37″W	Golden Gate Park	First municipal greenhouse in California and first and most important building Golden Gate Park
70	Goodman Building	Goodman Building	June 18, 1975 (#75000473)	1117 Geary Blvd. 37°47′08″N 122°25′20″W	Western Addition	
71	Grabhorn Press Building	Grabhorn Press Building	May 2, 1997 (#97000349)	1335 Sutter St. 37°47′15″N 122°25′21″W	Lower Pacific Heights	
72	Federal Office Building	Federal Office Building	June 5, 2017 (#100001018)	50 United Nations Plaza; 37°46′50″N 122°24′52″W	Civic Center	
73	Haas Candy Factory	Haas Candy Factory	January 8, 2001 (#00001622)	54 Mint St. 37°46′57″N 122°24′28″W	South of Market	
74	Haas-Lilienthal House	Haas-Lilienthal House	July 2, 1973 (#73000438)	2007 Franklin St. 37°47′36″N 122°25′29″W	Pacific Heights	
75	Hale Brothers Department Store	Hale Brothers Department Store	December 18, 1986 (#86003492)	901 Market St. • Boundary increase (listed May 10, 2001, refnum 01000490): 36 Fifth St., 423-27 and 429 Stevenson St. 37°47′01″N 122°24′29″W	South of Market	
76	Hall of Transportation, Treasure Island	Hall of Transportation, Treasure Island	February 26, 2008 (#08000082)	SE Side of California Ave. between Avenue D and Avenue F 37°49′07″N 122°22′04″W	Treasure Island	
77	Hallidie Building	Hallidie Building	November 19, 1971 (#71000185)	130 Sutter St. 37°47′24″N 122°24′11″W	Financial District	
78	Haslett Warehouse	Haslett Warehouse	March 28, 1975 (#75000172)	680 Beach St. 37°48′25″N 122°25′12″W	Fisherman's Wharf	
79	Herald Hotel	Herald Hotel	October 29, 1982 (#82000985)	308 Eddy St. 37°47′02″N 122°24′46″W	Tenderloin	1910 hotel by architect Alfred Henry Jacobs; contributing property to the Uptown Tenderloin Historic District; now a low-income public senior housing facility
80	Hercules (tugboat)	Hercules (tugboat)	January 17, 1975 (#75000225)	Hyde Street Pier, San Francisco Maritime National Historical Park, 2905 Hyde Street; 37°48′36″N 122°25′20″W	Fisherman's Wharf	1907 steam tug boat
81	Hobart Building	Hobart Building	September 10, 2021 (#100006911)	582-592 Market St. 37°47′22″N 122°24′06″W	Financial District	
82	Hotel Californian	Hotel Californian	September 25, 1998 (#98001195)	403 Taylor St. 37°47′11″N 122°24′41″W	Tenderloin	1923 hotel by architect Edward E. Young with 1929 addition by architect Alfred Henry Jacobs; contributing property to the Uptown Tenderloin Historic District; now the Serrano Hotel
83	House at 1239–1245 Scott Street	House at 1239–1245 Scott Street	March 8, 1973 (#73000441)	1239–1245 Scott St. 37°46′53″N 122°26′15″W	Western Addition	
84	House at 1249–1251 Scott Street	House at 1249–1251 Scott Street	March 8, 1973 (#73000442)	1249–1251 Scott St. 37°46′54″N 122°26′15″W	Western Addition	
85	House at 1254–1256 Montgomery Street	House at 1254–1256 Montgomery Street	January 31, 1979 (#79000532)	1254–1256 Montgomery St. 37°48′03″N 122°24′15″W	Telegraph Hill	One of the few buildings on Telegraph Hill to survive the 1906 earthquake
86	House at 1321 Scott Street	House at 1321 Scott Street	March 8, 1973 (#73000439)	1321 Scott St. 37°46′55″N 122°26′15″W	Western Addition	
87	House at 1331–1335 Scott Street	House at 1331–1335 Scott Street	March 8, 1973 (#73000440)	1331–1335 Scott St. 37°46′56″N 122°26′15″W	Western Addition	
88	House at 584 Page Street	House at 584 Page Street	September 12, 1985 (#85002195)	584 Page St. 37°46′24″N 122°25′49″W	Hayes Valley	Daniel Einstein House
89	Hunter-Dulin Building	Hunter-Dulin Building	April 17, 1997 (#97000348)	111 Sutter St. 37°47′24″N 122°24′09″W	Financial District	
90	Hunters Point Commercial Drydock Historic District	Hunters Point Commercial Drydock Historic District	July 25, 2012 (#12000425)	East of the junction of Fisher Ave. & Robinson Dr. 37°43′37″N 122°21′41″W	Bayview-Hunters Point	
91	Huntington Hotel	Huntington Hotel	September 23, 2025 (#100012288)	1075 California Street; 37°43′37″N 122°21′41″W		
92	International Hotel	International Hotel	June 15, 1977 (#77000333)	848 Kearny St. 37°47′46″N 122°24′18″W	Chinatown	
93	Jackson Brewing Company	Jackson Brewing Company	April 8, 1993 (#93000284)	1475–1489 Folsom St. and 319–351 11th St. 37°46′19″N 122°24′50″W	South of Market	
94	Jackson Square Historic District	Jackson Square Historic District	November 18, 1971 (#71000186)	Roughly bounded by Broadway on N, Sansome St. on E, Washington St. on S, and Columbus Ave. on W 37°47′49″N 122°24′12″W	Financial District	
95	Japanese YWCA	Japanese YWCA	January 10, 2020 (#100004868)	1830 Sutter St. 37°47′12″N 122°25′50″W	Japantown	Now the Nihonmachi Little Friends school
96	SS Jeremiah O'Brien	SS Jeremiah O'Brien	June 7, 1978 (#78003405)	Pier 3, Fort Mason Center; 37°48′40″N 122°25′05″W	Fisherman's Wharf	
97	Jessie Street Substation	Jessie Street Substation	September 6, 1974 (#74000555)	222–226 Jessie St. 37°47′10″N 122°24′13″W	South of Market	The building now houses the Contemporary Jewish Museum (opened June 2008)
98	San Francisco Juvenile Court and Detention Center	San Francisco Juvenile Court and Detention Center	April 8, 2011 (#11000182)	150 Otis St. 37°46′15″N 122°25′14″W	South of Market	
99	King Philip (ship) and Reporter (schooner) Shipwreck Site	King Philip (ship) and Reporter (schooner) Shipwreck Site	May 8, 1986 (#86001014)	Address Restricted	Ocean Beach	King Philip and Reporter shipwreck sites.
100	Kinmon Gakuen	Kinmon Gakuen	March 30, 2026 (#100012857)	2031 Bush Street; 37°47′14″N 122°25′51″W		
101	Koshland House	Koshland House	January 5, 1984 (#84001186)	3800 Washington St. 37°47′20″N 122°27′21″W	Presidio Heights	
102	Dr. Martin M. Krotoszyner Medical Offices and House	Dr. Martin M. Krotoszyner Medical Offices and House	August 15, 1985 (#85001784)	995–999 Sutter St. 37°47′17″N 122°25′00″W	Downtown	contributing property to the Lower Nob Hill Apartment Hotel District
103	Don Lee Building	Don Lee Building	October 28, 2001 (#01001179)	1000 Van Ness Ave. 37°47′06″N 122°25′16″W	Western Addition	
104	Lewis Ark (Houseboat)	Lewis Ark (Houseboat)	November 8, 1979 (#79000256)	Hyde Street Pier, San Francisco Maritime National Historical Park, 2905 Hyde Street; 37°48′29″N 122°25′15″W	Fisherman's Wharf	
105	Liberty Street Historic District	Liberty Street Historic District	September 15, 1983 (#83001230)	Roughly 15-188 Liberty St. 37°45′27″N 122°25′25″W	Eureka Valley	
106	Lotta Crabtree Fountain	Lotta Crabtree Fountain	June 20, 1975 (#75000475)	Market, Geary, and Kearny Sts. 37°47′16″N 122°24′12″W	Financial District	Survived the 1906 earthquake and served as a meeting point in its aftermath
107	Lower Nob Hill Apartment Hotel District	Lower Nob Hill Apartment Hotel District	July 31, 1991 (#91000957)	Roughly, 590—1209 Bush, 680—1156 Sutter and 600—1099 Post Sts. and the intersecting cross streets 37°47′19″N 122°24′49″W	Downtown/Union Square	
108	The Lydia	The Lydia	July 16, 1981 (#81000173)	At the foot of King Street near Pier 42; 37°46′51″N 122°23′18″W	South of Market	Whaling bark
109	Market Street Theatre and Loft District	Market Street Theatre and Loft District	April 10, 1986 (#86000729)	982–1112 Market, 973–1105 Market, 1 Jones, and 1–35 Taylor Sts. 37°46′55″N 122°24′39″W	Tenderloin	
110	Matson Building and Annex	Matson Building and Annex	November 29, 1995 (#95001384)	215 Market St. 37°47′34″N 122°23′48″W	Financial District	
111	McElroy Octagon House	McElroy Octagon House	February 23, 1972 (#72000250)	2645 Gough St. 37°47′52″N 122°25′39″W	Cow Hollow	
112	John McMullen House	John McMullen House	September 15, 1983 (#83001231)	827 Guerrero St. 37°45′28″N 122°25′24″W	Eureka Valley	
113	Mills Building and Tower	Mills Building and Tower	April 13, 1977 (#77000334)	220 Montgomery St. and 220 Bush St. 37°47′28″N 122°24′06″W	Financial District	
114	Mish House	Mish House	May 21, 1979 (#79000534)	1153 Oak St. 37°46′22″N 122°26′18″W	Haight-Ashbury	
115	Mission Cultural Center	Mission Cultural Center	December 29, 2020 (#100005987)	2868 Mission St. 37°45′04″N 122°25′14″W	Mission District	
116	Mission Dolores	Mission Dolores	March 16, 1972 (#72000251)	320 Dolores St. 37°45′51″N 122°25′36″W	Mission District	The oldest surviving structure in San Francisco
117	Moss Flats Building	Moss Flats Building	February 24, 1983 (#83001232)	1626 Great Hwy. 37°45′22″N 122°30′31″W	Sunset	
118	Mutual Savings Bank Building	Mutual Savings Bank Building	January 22, 2014 (#13001107)	700 Market St. 37°47′16″N 122°24′14″W	Financial District	
119	Myrtle Street Flats	Myrtle Street Flats	June 14, 1976 (#76000520)	234–248 Myrtle St. 37°47′07″N 122°25′20″W	Western Addition	
120	National Carbon Company Building	National Carbon Company Building	August 25, 1983 (#83001233)	599 8th St. 37°46′17″N 122°24′19″W	South of Market	
121	New Mission Theater	New Mission Theater	November 9, 2001 (#01001206)	2550 Mission St. 37°45′23″N 122°25′08″W	Mission District	San Francisco's New Mission Theater Chronology at The Friends of 1800 website.
122	Niantic (Storeship)	Niantic (Storeship)	May 16, 1991 (#91000563)	NW corner of Clay and Sansome Sts. 37°47′42″N 122°24′06″W	Financial District	
123	Ohlandt Newlyweds House	Ohlandt Newlyweds House	August 19, 1994 (#94000995)	1260 Potrero Ave. 37°45′08″N 122°24′23″W	Mission District	
124	Old Ohio Street Houses	Old Ohio Street Houses	May 31, 1979 (#79000535)	17–55 Osgood Pl. 37°47′53″N 122°24′11″W	Financial District	
125	Old U.S. Mint	Old U.S. Mint	October 15, 1966 (#66000231)	5th and Mission Sts. 37°46′58″N 122°24′26″W	South of Market	
126	One Lombard Street	One Lombard Street	February 3, 2010 (#09001300)	1 Lombard St. 37°48′15″N 122°24′10″W	Fisherman's Wharf	
127	Otis Elevator Company Building	Otis Elevator Company Building	October 21, 1999 (#99001265)	1 Beach St. 37°48′28″N 122°24′34″W	Fisherman's Wharf	
128	Pacific Gas and Electric Company General Office Building and Annex	Pacific Gas and Electric Company General Office Building and Annex	November 29, 1995 (#95001385)	245 Market St. 37°47′33″N 122°23′49″W	Financial District	
129	Pacific Gas and Electric Company Substation J	Pacific Gas and Electric Company Substation J	December 29, 1986 (#86003514)	565 Commercial and 568 Sacramento Sts. 37°47′38″N 122°24′08″W	Financial District	
130	Paige Motor Car Co. Building	Paige Motor Car Co. Building	February 24, 1983 (#83001234)	1699 Van Ness Ave. 37°47′28″N 122°25′22″W	Civic Center	
131	Palace of Fine and Decorative Arts, Treasure Island	Palace of Fine and Decorative Arts, Treasure Island	February 26, 2008 (#08000083)	SE Side of California Ave. between Avenue F and Avenue I 37°49′11″N 122°21′58″W	Treasure Island	"Regilded Gate", Time, 1939-09-04
132	Palace of Fine Arts	Palace of Fine Arts	December 5, 2005 (#04000659)	3301 Lyon St. 37°48′10″N 122°26′54″W	Marina District	
133	USS Pampanito (submarine)	USS Pampanito (submarine)	January 14, 1986 (#86000089)	Fisherman's Wharf-Pier 45; 37°48′36″N 122°24′59″W	Fisherman's Wharf	
134	Park View Hotel	Park View Hotel	August 11, 1983 (#83001235)	750 Stanyan St. 37°46′06″N 122°27′12″W	Haight-Ashbury	
135	Theodore F. Payne House	Theodore F. Payne House	June 11, 1980 (#80000847)	1409 Sutter St. 37°47′14″N 122°25′26″W	Lower Pacific Heights	
136	Timothy L. Pflueger House	Timothy L. Pflueger House	September 30, 2022 (#100008228)	1015 Guerrero St. 37°45′17″N 122°25′23″W		
137	Abner Phelps House	Abner Phelps House	May 23, 1979 (#71000187)	1111 Oak St. 37°46′22″N 122°26′17″W	Haight-Ashbury	
138	Pier One	Pier One	January 5, 1999 (#98001551)	Pier One, The Embarcadero (at Washington St.); 37°47′49″N 122°23′41″W	Embarcadero	
139	Pioneer Trunk Factory-C. A. Malm & Co.	Pioneer Trunk Factory-C. A. Malm & Co.	March 5, 1987 (#86003727)	2185–2199 Folsom and 3180 18th Sts. 37°45′44″N 122°24′53″W	Mission District	
140	Pioneer Woolen Mills and D. Ghirardelli Company	Pioneer Woolen Mills and D. Ghirardelli Company	April 29, 1982 (#82002249)	900 N. Point St. 37°48′20″N 122°25′25″W	Fisherman's Wharf	
141	Point Lobos Archaeological Sites	Point Lobos Archaeological Sites	November 7, 1976 (#76000176)	Address Restricted; 37°46′48″N 122°30′50″W	Richmond District	Sutro Baths
142	Port of San Francisco Embarcadero Historic District	Port of San Francisco Embarcadero Historic District	May 12, 2006 (#06000372)	From Pier 45 to Pier 48, The Embarcadero; 37°47′49″N 122°23′42″W	Embarcadero	
143	Presidio	Presidio	October 15, 1966 (#66000232)	Northern tip of San Francisco Peninsula on U.S. 101; 37°47′47″N 122°27′55″W	Presidio	
144	Pumping Station No. 2 San Francisco Fire Department Auxiliary Water Supply System	Pumping Station No. 2 San Francisco Fire Department Auxiliary Water Supply System	May 13, 1976 (#76000177)	N end of Van Ness Ave; 37°48′29″N 122°25′37″W	Fisherman's Wharf	A crucial component of San Francisco's independent water supply system for fighting fires, separate from the domestic water system.
145	Quarters 1, Yerba Buena Island Naval Training Station	Quarters 1, Yerba Buena Island Naval Training Station	September 10, 1991 (#91001380)	1 Whiting Way, Yerba Buena Island; 37°48′46″N 122°21′49″W	Yerba Buena Island	
146	Quarters 10 and Building 267, Yerba Buena Island	Quarters 10 and Building 267, Yerba Buena Island	February 26, 2008 (#08000084)	Jct. Northgate & Macalla Rds., North Shore of Yerba Buena Island; 37°48′43″N 122°21′51″W	Yerba Buena Island	
147	Raymond Hotel Apartments		July 13, 2026 (#100013199)	20 Franklin Street; 37°46′29″N 122°25′15″W		
148	Rialto Building	Rialto Building	January 3, 2011 (#10001108)	116 New Montgomery St. 37°47′14″N 122°24′01″W	South of Market	
149	Rincon Annex	Rincon Annex	November 16, 1979 (#79000537)	101–199 Mission St. 37°47′34″N 122°23′36″W	South Beach	
150	SS Rio de Janeiro Shipwreck	SS Rio de Janeiro Shipwreck	November 3, 1988 (#88002394)	Address Restricted	Golden Gate	
151	Roos House	Roos House	October 8, 2009 (#09000805)	3500 Jackson St. 37°47′26″N 122°27′10″W	Presidio Heights	
152	Russian Hill-Macondray Lane District	Russian Hill-Macondray Lane District	January 7, 1988 (#87002286)	Roughly 900—982 Green, 1918—1960 Jones, 15—84 Macondray & 1801—1809 Taylor; 37°47′57″N 122°24′53″W	Russian Hill	
153	Russian Hill-Paris Block Architectural District	Russian Hill-Paris Block Architectural District	January 7, 1988 (#87002288)	Roughly 1017—1067 Green St. 37°47′54″N 122°24′59″W	Russian Hill	
154	Russian Hill-Vallejo Street Crest District	Russian Hill-Vallejo Street Crest District	January 22, 1988 (#87002289)	Roughly 1020–1032 Broadway, 1–49 Florence, 1728–1742 Jones, 1–7 Russian Hill Pl., 1629–1715 Taylor, & 1000–1085 Vallejo; 37°47′52″N 122°24′52″W	Russian Hill	
155	Sacred Heart Parish Complex	Sacred Heart Parish Complex	September 28, 2017 (#100001665)	546 and 554 Fillmore, 735 Fell & 660 Oak Sts. 37°46′29″N 122°25′52″W	Western Addition	
156	St. Francis Wood Historic District	St. Francis Wood Historic District	June 30, 2022 (#100007846)	Bounded by Portola Dr., San Pablo and Santa Paula Aves., San Jacinto Way, San Andreas Way, Junipero Serra and Monterey Blvds. 37°44′06″N 122°28′05″W		
157	St. Luke's Episcopal Church		December 26, 2023 (#100009644)	1760 Van Ness Avenue; 37°47′31″N 122°25′21″W		
158	San Francisco Art Institute	San Francisco Art Institute	January 5, 2016 (#15000950)	800 Chestnut St. 37°48′13″N 122°25′02″W	Russian Hill	Noted "for its role in the development of American art and for its contributions to art education" in the US
159	San Francisco Cable Cars	San Francisco Cable Cars	October 15, 1966 (#66000233)	1390 Washington St. 37°47′38″N 122°24′58″W	Multiple neighborhoods	
160	San Francisco Central YMCA	San Francisco Central YMCA	April 9, 2018 (#100002287)	220 Golden Gate Ave. 37°46′55″N 122°24′51″W	Tenderloin	
161	San Francisco Civic Center Historic District	San Francisco Civic Center Historic District	October 10, 1978 (#78000757)	Roughly bounded by Golden Gate Ave., 7th, Franklin, Hayes, and Market Sts. 37°46′46″N 122°25′03″W	Civic Center	Includes City Hall, Civic Auditorium, Old Public Library, Earl Warren Building, Old Federal Building, War Memorial Opera House, Veterans Building and the Civic Center Powerhouse
162	San Francisco Fire Department Engine Co. Number 2	San Francisco Fire Department Engine Co. Number 2	April 17, 2002 (#02000371)	460 Bush St. 37°47′27″N 122°24′18″W	Downtown	
163	San Francisco Maritime National Historic Park	San Francisco Maritime National Historic Park	June 27, 1988 (#01000281)	Fort Mason, Bld. 201; 37°48′20″N 122°25′41″W	Fort Mason	
164	San Francisco National Guard Armory and Arsenal	San Francisco National Guard Armory and Arsenal	November 14, 1978 (#78000758)	1800 Mission St. 37°46′05″N 122°25′13″W	Mission District	
165	San Francisco–Oakland Bay Bridge	San Francisco–Oakland Bay Bridge	August 13, 2001 (#00000525)	I-80; 37°48′02″N 122°22′31″W	San Francisco Bay	
166	San Francisco Port of Embarkation, US Army	San Francisco Port of Embarkation, US Army	February 4, 1985 (#85002433)	Ft. Mason; 37°48′26″N 122°25′52″W	Fort Mason	
167	San Francisco Public Library North Beach Branch	San Francisco Public Library North Beach Branch	August 8, 2011 (#11000501)	2000 Mason St. 37°48′07″N 122°24′46″W	North Beach	
168	San Francisco State Teacher's College	San Francisco State Teacher's College	January 7, 2008 (#07001391)	55 Laguna St. 37°46′17″N 122°25′32″W	Hayes Valley	One of the few surviving examples of the Teacher's Colleges that served as the foundation for the California State University system.
169	M.V. Santa Rosa	M.V. Santa Rosa	May 29, 1979 (#79000469)	Pier 3, San Francisco; 37°47′54″N 122°23′43″W	Embarcadero	Listed in the NRIS database as located Howard Terminal, Oakland. The vessel, now moored at Pier 3 in San Francisco, is owned by Hornblower Yachts and has been used as a concert venue.
170	Schoenstein and Company Pipe Organ Factory	Schoenstein and Company Pipe Organ Factory	November 14, 1978 (#78000759)	3101 20th St. 37°45′32″N 122°24′42″W	Mission District	
171	Irving Murray Scott School	Irving Murray Scott School	April 11, 1985 (#85000714)	1060 Tennessee St. 37°45′31″N 122°23′22″W	Potrero Hill	Oldest surviving public school building in the city
172	Second and Howard Streets District	Second and Howard Streets District	July 28, 1999 (#99000894)	121–198 2nd, 579–612 Howard, 116 Natoma, 111–163 New Montgomery; 37°47′14″N 122°23′57″W	South of Market	
173	Senior Officers Quarters Historic District, Yerba Buena Island	Senior Officers Quarters Historic District, Yerba Buena Island	February 26, 2008 (#08000085)	Whiting Way at Northgate Rd., North shore of Yerba Buena Island; 37°48′47″N 122°21′51″W	Yerba Buena Island	Includes Quarters 1–7 and associated garages (Buildings 83, 205, and 230).
174	Sinton House	Sinton House	December 22, 2011 (#11000944)	1020 Francisco St. 37°48′13″N 122°25′19″W	Russian Hill	
175	Six-Inch Rifled Gun No. 9	Six-Inch Rifled Gun No. 9	February 7, 1979 (#79000255)	Baker Beach; 37°47′37″N 122°28′58″W	Presidio	
176	South San Francisco Opera House	South San Francisco Opera House	March 21, 2011 (#11000117)	4701–4705 Third St. and 1601 Newcomb Ave. 37°44′06″N 122°23′25″W	Bayview-Hunters Point	
177	Southern Pacific Company Hospital Historic District	Southern Pacific Company Hospital Historic District	May 5, 1989 (#89000319)	1400 Fell St. 37°46′25″N 122°26′28″W	North Panhandle	
178	John Spencer House	John Spencer House	April 14, 2005 (#05000273)	1080 Haight St. 37°46′16″N 122°26′25″W	Haight-Ashbury	
179	Stadtmuller House	Stadtmuller House	July 19, 1976 (#76000523)	819 Eddy St. 37°46′57″N 122°25′18″W	Western Addition	
180	St. John's Presbyterian Church	St. John's Presbyterian Church	January 22, 1996 (#95001555)	25 Lake St. and 201 Arguello Blvd. 37°47′12″N 122°27′34″W	Presidio Heights	
181	St. Joseph's Church and Complex	St. Joseph's Church and Complex	January 15, 1982 (#82002250)	1401–1415 Howard St. 37°46′25″N 122°24′52″W	South of Market	
182	St. Joseph's Hospital	St. Joseph's Hospital	May 9, 1985 (#85001016)	355 Buena Vista Ave. East; 37°46′03″N 122°26′24″W	Buena Vista	
183	St. Paulus Lutheran Church	St. Paulus Lutheran Church	February 11, 1982 (#82002251)	999 Eddy St. 37°46′57″N 122°25′26″W	Western Addition	Burned to the ground November 1995.
184	Swedenborgian Church	Swedenborgian Church	August 18, 2004 (#04001154)	3200 Washington St. 37°47′25″N 122°26′46″W	Pacific Heights	
185	Swedish American Hall	Swedish American Hall	September 20, 2019 (#100004413)	2168–2174 Market St. 37°46′00″N 122°25′49″W		
186	Temple Sherith Israel	Temple Sherith Israel	March 31, 2010 (#10000114)	2266 California St. 37°47′22″N 122°25′54″W	Pacific Heights	
187	The Real Estate Associates (TREA) Houses	The Real Estate Associates (TREA) Houses	April 4, 1985 (#85000705)	2503, 2524, 2530 and 2536 Clay Sts. 37°47′26″N 122°26′05″W	Pacific Heights	
188	Tobin House	Tobin House	October 5, 2009 (#09000806)	1969 California St. 37°47′22″N 122°25′36″W	Lower Pacific Heights	
189	Torpedo Storehouse-Torpedo (Mine) Assembly Building & Long Range Accuracy Storage Building	Torpedo Storehouse-Torpedo (Mine) Assembly Building & Long Range Accuracy Storage Building	June 11, 2008 (#08000086)	East Point; North Shore of Yerba Buena Island; 37°48′53″N 122°21′33″W	Yerba Buena Island	1891 torpedo assembly building built for the US Army by architect Ernest Leslie Ransome
190	Trinity Presbyterian Church	Trinity Presbyterian Church	March 2, 1982 (#82002252)	3261 23rd St. 37°45′14″N 122°25′03″W	Mission District	
191	Tubbs Cordage Company Office Building	Tubbs Cordage Company Office Building	November 6, 1979 (#79000254)	Hyde Street Pier, San Francisco Maritime National Historical Park, 2905 Hyde Street; 37°48′32″N 122°25′16″W	Fisherman's Wharf	
192	Union Ferry Depot	Union Ferry Depot	December 1, 1978 (#78000760)	Embarcadero at Market St. 37°47′43″N 122°23′37″W	Embarcadero	
193	Union Iron Works Historic District	Union Iron Works Historic District	April 17, 2014 (#14000150)	E. of Illinois between 18th & 22nd Sts. 37°45′39″N 122°23′04″W	Potrero Point	
194	Uptown Tenderloin Historic District	Uptown Tenderloin Historic District	February 5, 2009 (#08001407)	All or part of 33 blocks roughly bounded by Market, McAllister, Golden Gate, Larkin, Geary, Taylor, Ellis Sts. 37°47′02″N 122°24′51″W	Tenderloin	
195	U.S. Appraisers Stores and Immigration Station	U.S. Appraisers Stores and Immigration Station	August 13, 2013 (#13000590)	630 Sansome St. 37°47′47″N 122°24′06″W	Financial District	
196	U.S. Customhouse	U.S. Customhouse	January 29, 1975 (#75000476)	555 Battery St. 37°47′47″N 122°24′03″W	Financial District	
197	U.S. Mint	U.S. Mint	February 18, 1988 (#88000026)	155 Hermann St. 37°46′13″N 122°25′39″W	Hayes Valley	
198	U.S. Post Office and Courthouse	U.S. Post Office and Courthouse	October 14, 1971 (#71000188)	NE corner of 7th and Mission Sts. 37°46′46″N 122°24′40″W	South of Market	National Historic Landmark designation October 16, 2012
199	Veterans Affairs Medical Center-San Francisco, California	Veterans Affairs Medical Center-San Francisco, California	April 20, 2009 (#05001112)	4150 Clement Street; 37°46′56″N 122°30′15″W	Sea Cliff	
200	Russell Warren House	Russell Warren House	December 12, 1983 (#83003594)	465–467 Oak St. and 368 Lily St. 37°46′27″N 122°25′37″W	Hayes Valley	
201	George Washington High School	George Washington High School	June 11, 2026 (#100013126)	600 32nd Avenue; 37°46′40″N 122°29′28″W		Register entry shown as "Appeal" on June 11, 2026.
202	Julian Waybur House	Julian Waybur House	March 28, 2011 (#11000143)	3232 Pacific Ave. 37°47′30″N 122°26′53″W	Presidio Heights	
203	William Westerfeld House	William Westerfeld House	March 16, 1989 (#89000197)	1198 Fulton St. 37°46′38″N 122°26′11″W	Alamo Square	
204	Western Manufacturing Company Building		November 16, 2020 (#100009717)	149 9th Street; 37°46′32″N 122°24′50″W	South of Market	
205	John A. Whelan House		November 16, 2020 (#100005794)	1315 Waller St. 37°46′09″N 122°26′44″W	Haight-Ashbury	
206	Whittier Mansion	Whittier Mansion	April 26, 1976 (#76000524)	2090 Jackson St. 37°47′36″N 122°25′46″W	Pacific Heights	
207	Albert Wilford Houses	Albert Wilford Houses	August 29, 1985 (#85001914)	2121 & 2127 Vallejo St. 37°47′43″N 122°25′56″W	Pacific Heights	
208	Woman's Athletic Club of San Francisco	Woman's Athletic Club of San Francisco	September 10, 2004 (#04000955)	640 Sutter St. 37°47′20″N 122°24′40″W	Union Square	Now known as the Metropolitan Club
209	The Women's Building	The Women's Building	April 30, 2018 (#100002359)	3543 18th St. 37°45′42″N 122°25′21″W	Mission District	
210	Yerba Buena Island Lighthouse	Yerba Buena Island Lighthouse	September 3, 1991 (#91001096)	Yerba Buena Island; 37°48′26″N 122°21′44″W	Yerba Buena Island	part of the Light Stations of California Multiple Property Submission
211	YMCA Hotel	YMCA Hotel	February 6, 1986 (#86000148)	351 Turk St. 37°46′57″N 122°24′54″W	Tenderloin	1928 hotel by architect Frederick Meyer; contributing property to the Uptown Tenderloin Historic District

== Former listings ==
	Name on the Register	Image	Date listed	Date removed	Location	City or town	Description
1	Fitzhugh Building		January 20, 1976 (#76000519)	July 2, 1979	384 Post St.	San Francisco	Demolished in 1980 to make way for the new Saks department store
2	House at 1334-36 Scott Street		March 1, 1973 (#73002249)	October 31, 1973	1334-36 Scott Street	Western Addition	Demolished
3	Wapama	Wapama	April 24, 1973 (#73000228)	February 7, 2015	Hyde Street Pier, San Francisco Maritime National Historical Park, 2905 Hyde Street; 37°48′28″N 122°25′16″W	Fisherman's Wharf	steam schooner; scrapped in 2013; moved to drydock at Richmond Shipyard #3; NHL and NRHP designations withdrawn in 2015

== See also ==
- California Historical Landmarks in San Francisco
- List of National Historic Landmarks in California
- List of San Francisco Designated Landmarks
- National Register of Historic Places listings in California
