= Stadtmuller =

Stadtmuller, or Stadtmüller is a surname of German origin, and roughly translated to English means "city miller". It may refer to:

- Georg Stadtmüller (1909–1935), German historian and Albanologist
- Karl-Heinz Stadtmüller (1953–2008), East German race walker
- Joseph Peter Stadtmueller (born 1942), American lawyer and judge

== Other uses ==
- Stadtmuller House, San Francisco, California
