= Buon Gusto Sausage Factory =

Historic home in San Francisco, built in 1875

Coordinates: 37°47′58.31″N 122°24′28.97″W

- U.S. National Register of Historic Places
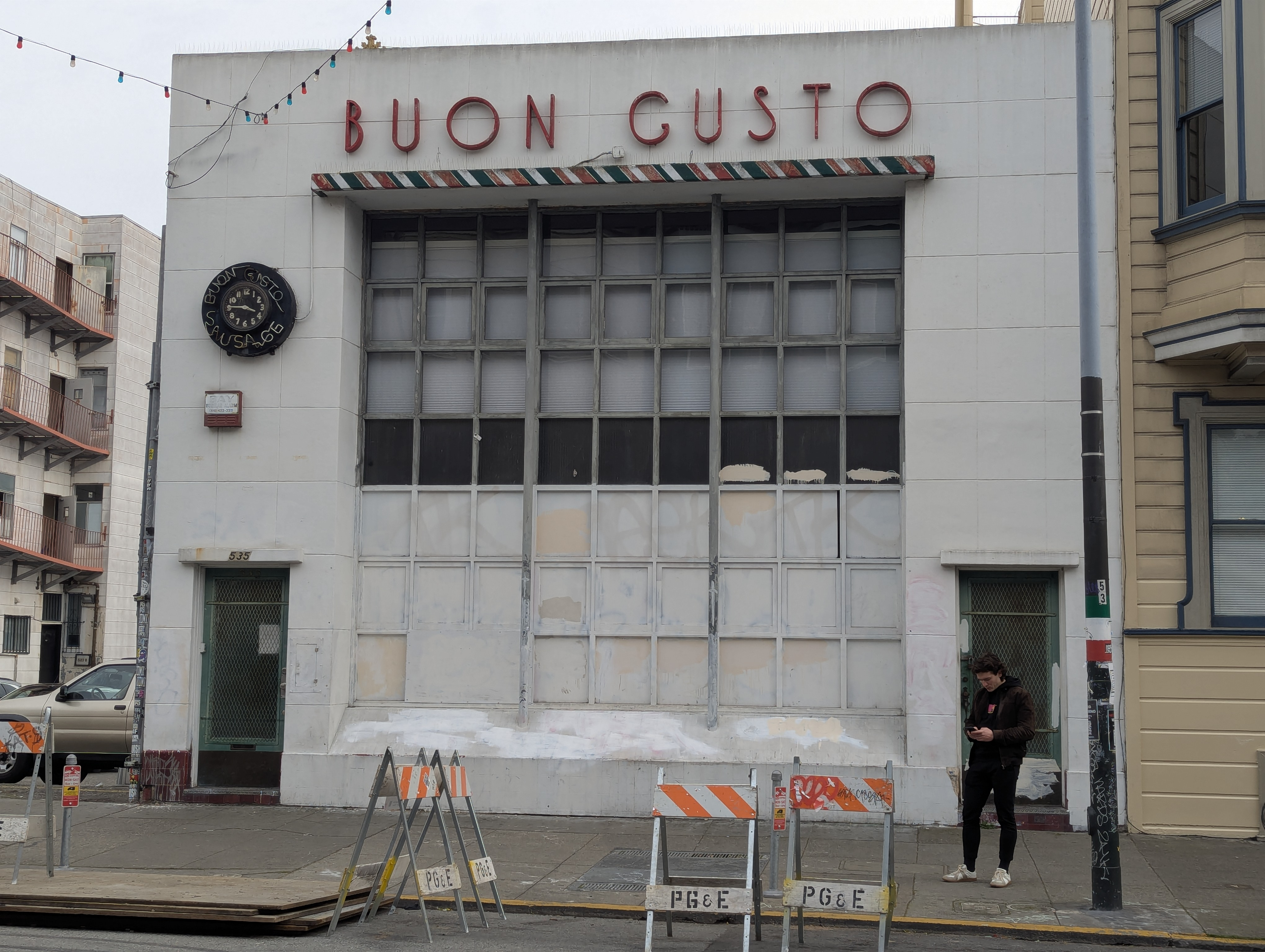

- Location within San Francisco County Location within California Location within the United States
- Location: 535 Green St., San Francisco, California, U.S.
- Area: 0.251 acres (0.102 ha)
- Built: 1948; 78 years ago
- Architect: Martin J. Rist
- Architectural style: International Style
- NRHP reference No.: 100006073
- Added to NRHP: February 1, 2021

Buon Gusto Sausage Factory is a historic building completed in 1948 located in the North Beach neighborhood of San Francisco, California. It was designed in an International Style by master architect Martin J. Rist. It was listed for sale in 2017 for potential redevelopment, but it was later added to the National Register of Historic Places and development plans had stalled by 2020.

== See also ==
- List of San Francisco Designated Landmarks
- National Register of Historic Places listings in San Francisco
