= Koshland House =

- U.S. National Register of Historic Places
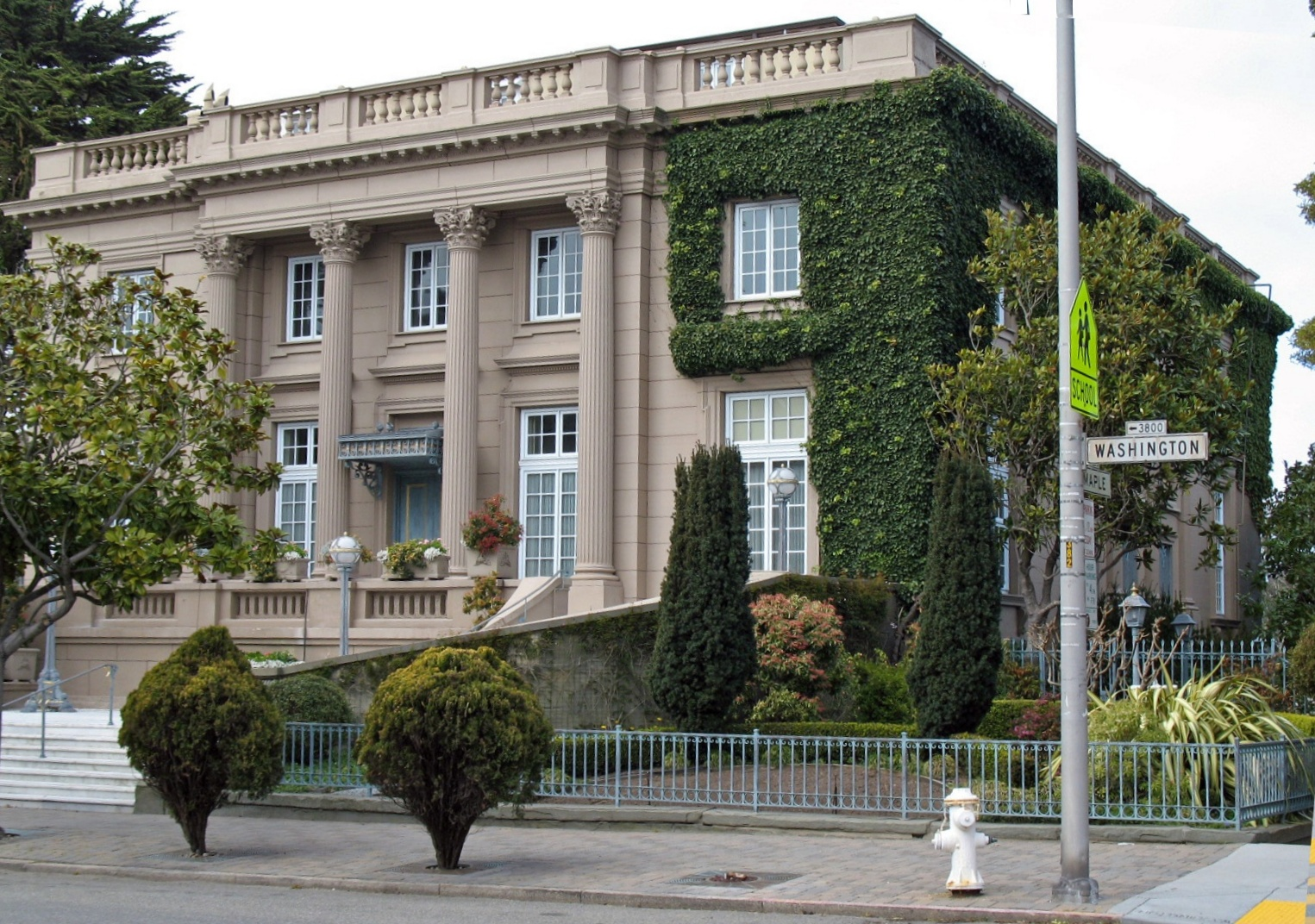
- Koshland House in 2008

- Location within San Francisco County Location within California Location within the United States
- Location: 3800 Washington St., San Francisco, California
- Coordinates: 37°47′20″N 122°27′16″W
- Area: 0.5 acres (0.20 ha)
- Built: 1902
- Architect: Franklin S. Van Trees
- Architectural style: Classical Revival
- NRHP reference No.: 84001186
- Added to NRHP: January 5, 1984

Koshland House, also known as "Le Petit Trianon", is a private residence in the Presidio Heights neighborhood of San Francisco, California. It has been one of San Francisco's most prominent and celebrated homes for over 100 years.

The property was established as San Francisco Landmark 95 by the City and County of San Francisco on July 9, 1977, and it was placed on the National Register of Historic Places listings on December 9, 1983. In 1976, it received high ratings in San Francisco's Department of City Planning's "Architectural Inventory", which rates only the top 10 percent of San Francisco's buildings.

== History ==
The mansion, located at 3800 Washington Street, was constructed from 1902 to 1904 for Marcus and Corinne Koshland. Marcus Koshland (1858–1930) was a son of Simon Koshland, the founder of Koshland Brothers, a firm that imported and exported wool, hides and fur.

In 1900, Corinne, Marcus, their three children (Daniel, Robert and Margaret) and a nursemaid embarked on a European tour, which took them to France. There, Corinne fell in love with the Palace of Versailles and especially with the Petit Trianon, thus inspiring the construction of the home on a lot at the corner of Washington and Maple streets, a gift from her father.

Corinne Koshland, because of her love of music, played an important role in the establishment of the San Francisco Symphony and the San Francisco Opera. During her lifetime, the home was the scene of musical events which generated support for the Symphony. Musicians who either entertained or were houseguests at the house during this period included Yehudi Menuhin (whose education was partially financed by Mrs. Koshland), Issac Stern, Leonard Bernstein, Jascha Heifitz, Pierre Monteaux and Igor Stravinski.

In 1912, Corinne and Marcus hosted an eighteenth-century themed soirée in the home's ballroom, in celebration of a visit from Boston relatives. Every Hannukah from 1928 to 1940, Cantor Reuben Rinder of Temple Emanu-El conducted Jewish musicals in the home.

The second owners of the mansion were Mr. and Mrs. Walter Buck, who purchased it for $100,000 in March 1955. He was a successful financier who served for a time as president of the California Palace of the Legion of Honor.

Walter Buck remained in the home until 1977, when the mansion was purchased by attorney Paul Renne for $525,000. The house changed hands again in 1982, to be owned by Charles Pankow and Heide Betz, an art consultant. It was later owned by internet pioneer Halsey Minor, who lost it in a bankruptcy sale.

By 2015, the house had fallen derelict and was squatted. In 2019, it was put on the market by Joel Goodrich for $30 million.

In both 1982 and 2019, it was the site of the San Francisco Decorator's Showcase, which brings together the Bay Area's best designers to show off their talents.

== Architecture ==
Designed by Franklin S. Van Trees, it was modeled after the Petit Trianon, a château located on the grounds of the Palace of Versailles in Versailles, France. While there are minor differences in the details, the concept, massing, and proportions of 3800 Washington are virtually identical to the French original.

The building is also associated with the work of artist Bruce Porter, who designed and executed the art glass windows and the original formal landscaping (since replaced).

=== Exterior ===
The nearly 18,000 square foot, three-story building (above a partially submerged basement) is approximately sixty feet wide by seventy-five feet deep. It is of brick construction with a Colusa sandstone veneer. The sandstone is regular ashlar blocks, l'-6" x 5'-0" generally, 4" thick, tied onto the structure with wrought iron or mild steel cramps. The exterior face of the block and carved ornament is dressed in a regular horizontal pattern of grooves called broaching, or broached ashlar. The presence of a fine red lichen growing on the stone gives the building a pinkish cast.

The front elevation of the home is an academic replica of the Petit Trianon at Versailles, designed by Ange-Jacques Gabriel in 1761 for Louis XV. It features a balustraded parapet atop the second floor, over a classical entablature with bracketed cornice, plain frieze, and banded architrave. It is composed of five equal bays separated by four Corinthian columns. The columns have traditional Corinthian capitals, slender fluted shafts two stories high, and attic bases resting upon smooth-faced plinths.

The monumental sandstone terraced entrance features white marble steps and landings rising to a pair of symmetric curving stairs which arrive at a broad marble terrace, which is the main entrance to the building. There are four cast iron light standards, each about nine feet tall, which feature lavender glass spheres on top and clusters of four dolphins at the base.

There are regularly spaced French windows at both floors. The first floor has pairs of ten-light casements below an eight-light transom. The upper floor has pairs of eight-light casements. The third floor has a flat roof, painted cement plaster exterior walls, and irregularly spaced double hung windows.

The east elevation has the same parapet and entablature. It is divided into five bays, with four Corinthian pilasters similar in detail to the front columns. It is here that the basement level can be seen. It is surfaced in heavily rusticated sandstone with deep-set openings for double hung windows, secured behind tubular wrought iron grilles.

Between the four pilasters are three large art glass windows designed by artisan and poet Bruce Porter, who was born in 1865. The middle window bears the greeting Salve (Welcome) and the date MCMIV. The flanking windows are images of female-headed terns. There are three smaller art glass windows at the third level, and all are executed in a palette of pink, purple, green, yellow, and blue.

The rear elevation, which is also framed with the parapet, entablature, and rusticated base, has no pilasters or columns. It has unevenly spaced openings, all glazed with the same window type as the front. There is also a small sandstone stair that leads from the garden level to the first floor in one continuous rise. There is one small unglazed opening on the second floor which opens onto a porch, and there is a large fireplace stack centered on the east one-half of this elevation and extending above the parapet.

The west elevation has irregularly spaced openings, reflecting the plan functions within. It, too, has a large fireplace stack extending above the parapet. It features a cast iron and glass enclosed entrance porch.

Much of the cornice and all four front columns collapsed in the San Francisco earthquake of 1906, but were replaced soon thereafter.

=== Interior ===
The interiors of 3800 Washington feature many notable rooms.

Foyer. The foyer is a small rotunda with white marble floors and dark green marble walls. It is flanked on either side by a pair of small conservatories, each accessed by three pair of curved French doors. Each conservatory has a large stone planter.

The Atrium. This room was designed to bring light into the center of the house. An opening roughly eighteen feet on each side penetrates the two uppermost floors of the building and is capped by a skylight. At the first floor, the atrium features eight green Irish marble columns with bronze capitals and bases.

The Salon. The original decor (no longer existent) of this room was said to have been imported in its entirety from an 18th century French chateau. The room features a 12-foot-high white marble fireplace with a rose marble inset. The room is paneled in a light, soft wood which appears to have been sandblasted. There are large wooden columns, pediments, and cornices and a plaster barrel vaulted ceiling.

The Library. This room was designed to conceal books behind a system of large wooden panels which are detailed with concealed hardware. The panels are flanked by large wooden columns, and all of the woodwork was originally a dark mahogany. There is an elaborately coffered ceiling and rust-colored marble fireplace.

The Dining Room. This room was also paneled in two dark-colored woods and originally featured accents of gold-tooled green leather. The leather has been removed. There is a beamed ceiling with gothic detailing and an enormous fireplace with dark green marble facing and a wooden mantel supported by two nearly life-size carved figures of Bacchus.

The Ballroom. In the basement, there is a large hall of mirrors which runs the entire width of the house. Each wall features panels of mirrors framed by elaborate gilded boiserie. There are raised platforms at each end which were designed to be used as stages for musical performances. The finishes in this room were restored to their original character in 1982, although the original silvering on the mirrors remains.

Second Floor Living Room. The second largest room in the house, it originally featured a dark wooden wainscot and beamed ceiling. It, too, has a large fireplace, this one in tan stone with an arched opening.
