= Henry Geilfuss House =

Italian Villa style home in California

- U.S. National Register of Historic Places
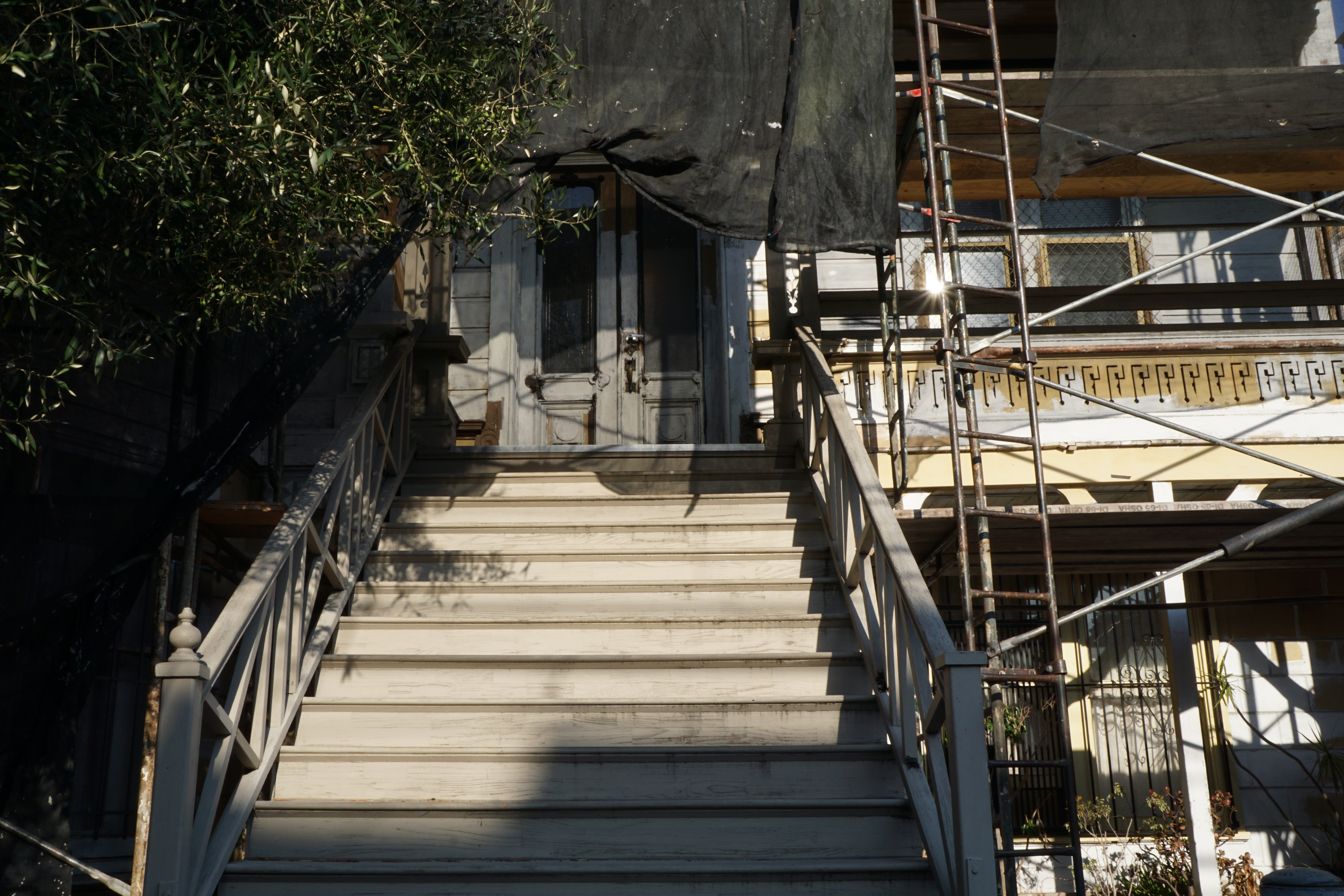
- 2017

- Location within San Francisco County Location within California Location within the United States
- Location: 811 Treat Avenue San Francisco, California 94110
- Coordinates: 37.756944°N 122.413056°W
- Built: 1882
- Architect: Henry Geilfuss
- Architectural style: Italian Villa style
- NRHP reference No.: 100001338
- Added to NRHP: July 24, 2017

Henry Geilfuss House is an 1882 Italian Villa style home built by architect Henry Geilfuss. The home is in San Francisco California and is on the National Register of Historic Places listings in California.

== Background ==
The home was constructed in 1882 and it is Stick-frame construction in the style of Italianate architecture. The building is two stories with a flat roof. The home sits on a 7,000 sq ft (650 m^{2}) lot which faces Treat Avenue.

== History ==
The property was designed by local architect Henry Geilfuss in 1882 as his personal residence. A workshop was added in 1900.

The home was added to the National Register of Historic Places in 2017.

== See also ==
- National Register of Historic Places listings in San Francisco
