= House at 1254–1256 Montgomery Street =

Historic house in California, United States

- U.S. National Register of Historic Places
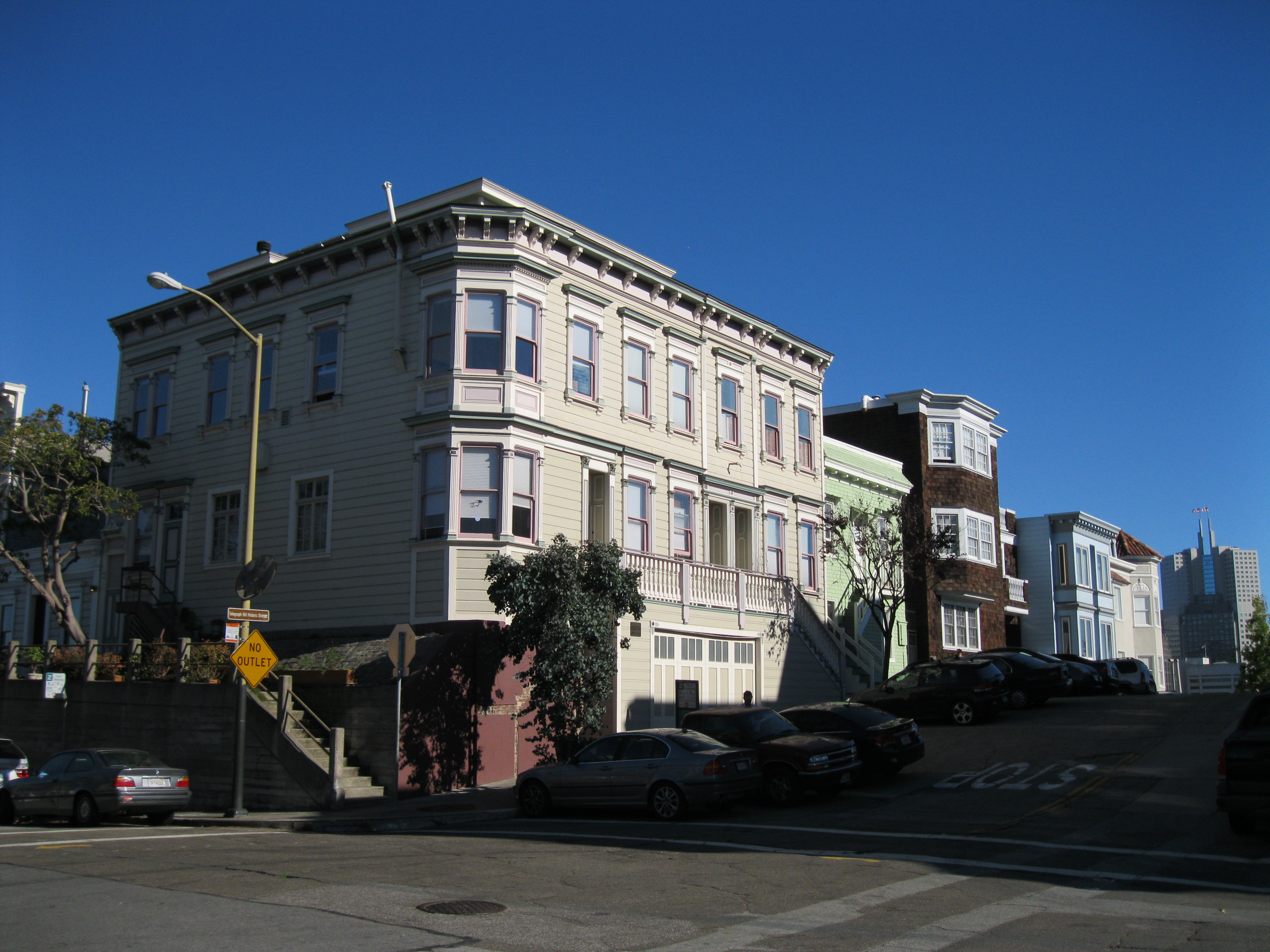

- Location within San Francisco County Location within California Location within the United States
- Location: 1254–1256 Montgomery Street, San Francisco, California
- Coordinates: 37°48′4″N 122°24′10″W
- Area: 0.1 acres (0.040 ha)
- Built: 1865
- Architectural style: Italianate
- NRHP reference No.: 79000532
- Added to NRHP: January 31, 1979

The house at 1254–1256 Montgomery Street is a historic house located in the Telegraph Hill neighborhood of San Francisco. Construction commenced in the early 1860s [partial first floor] and sits on a secondary summit of the hill, which was also the site of a windmill that burned in 1861. The house's Italianate architecture design features large windows on the front corner, double-hung sash windows decorated with pilasters and cornices, and a bracketed cornice along the roofline. While the house originally had only one story, its second story was part of its original plan and constructed by the 1890s. The house is one of the few buildings on Telegraph Hill which survived the 1906 San Francisco earthquake and its aftermath.

The house was added to the National Register of Historic Places on January 31, 1979.

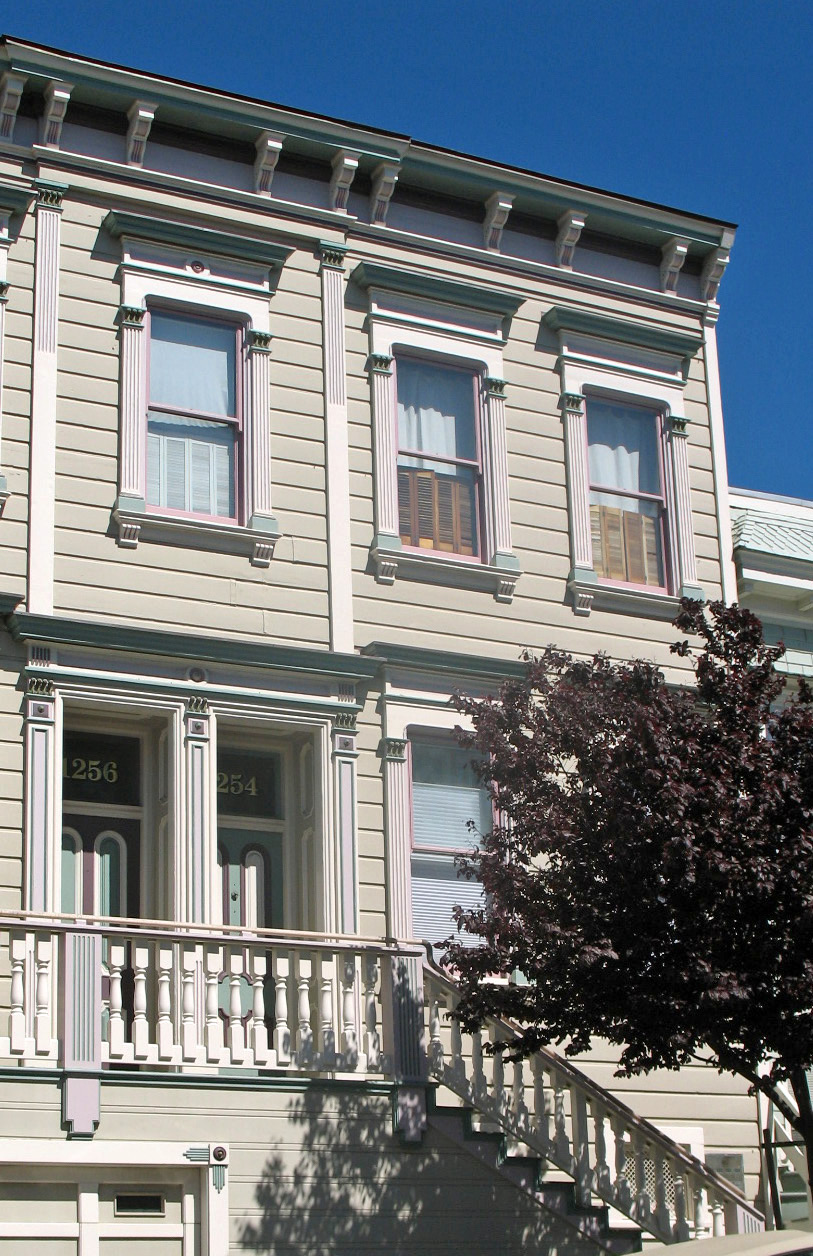
Entrance to the house

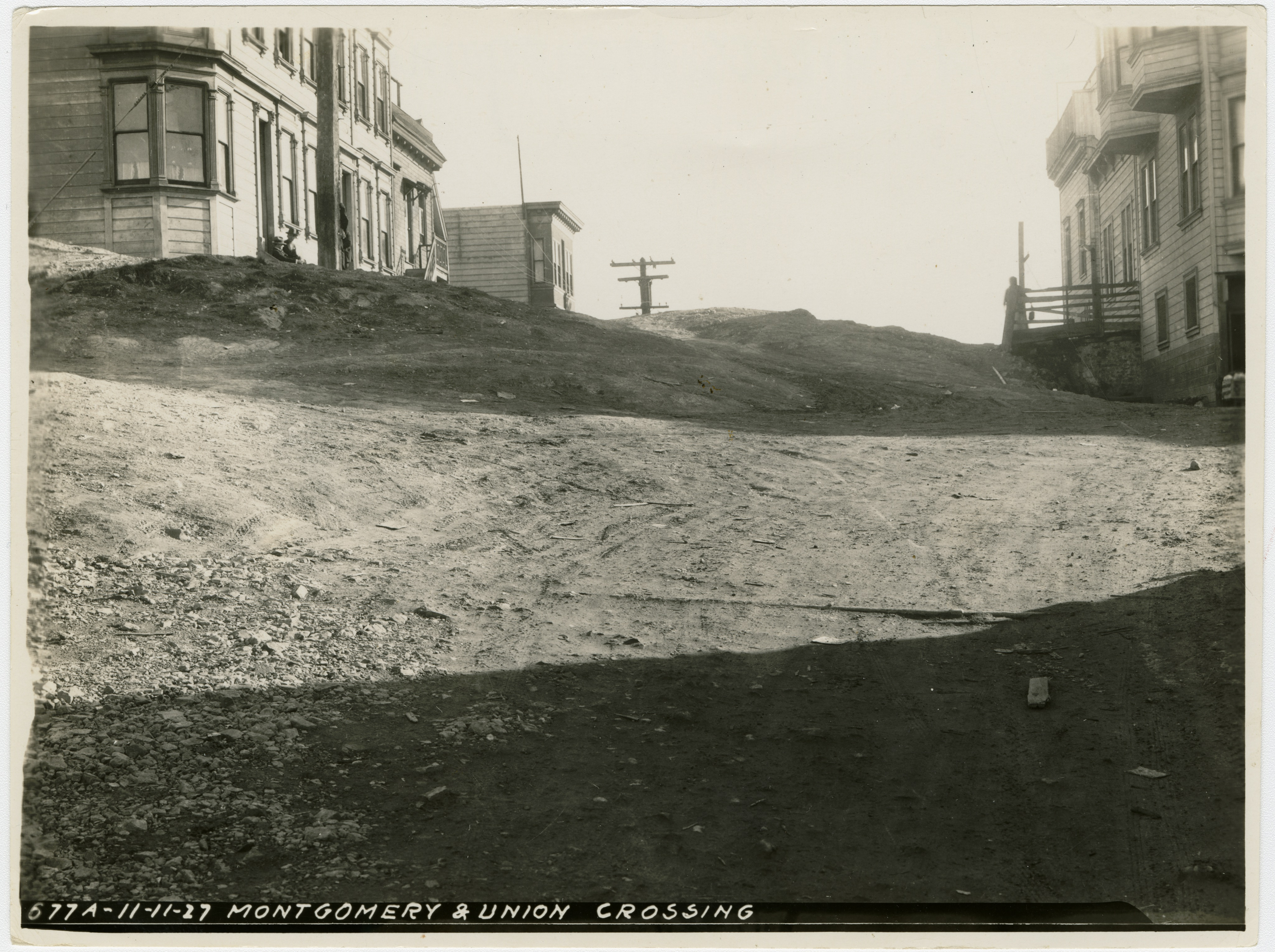
Montgomery looking South 1927

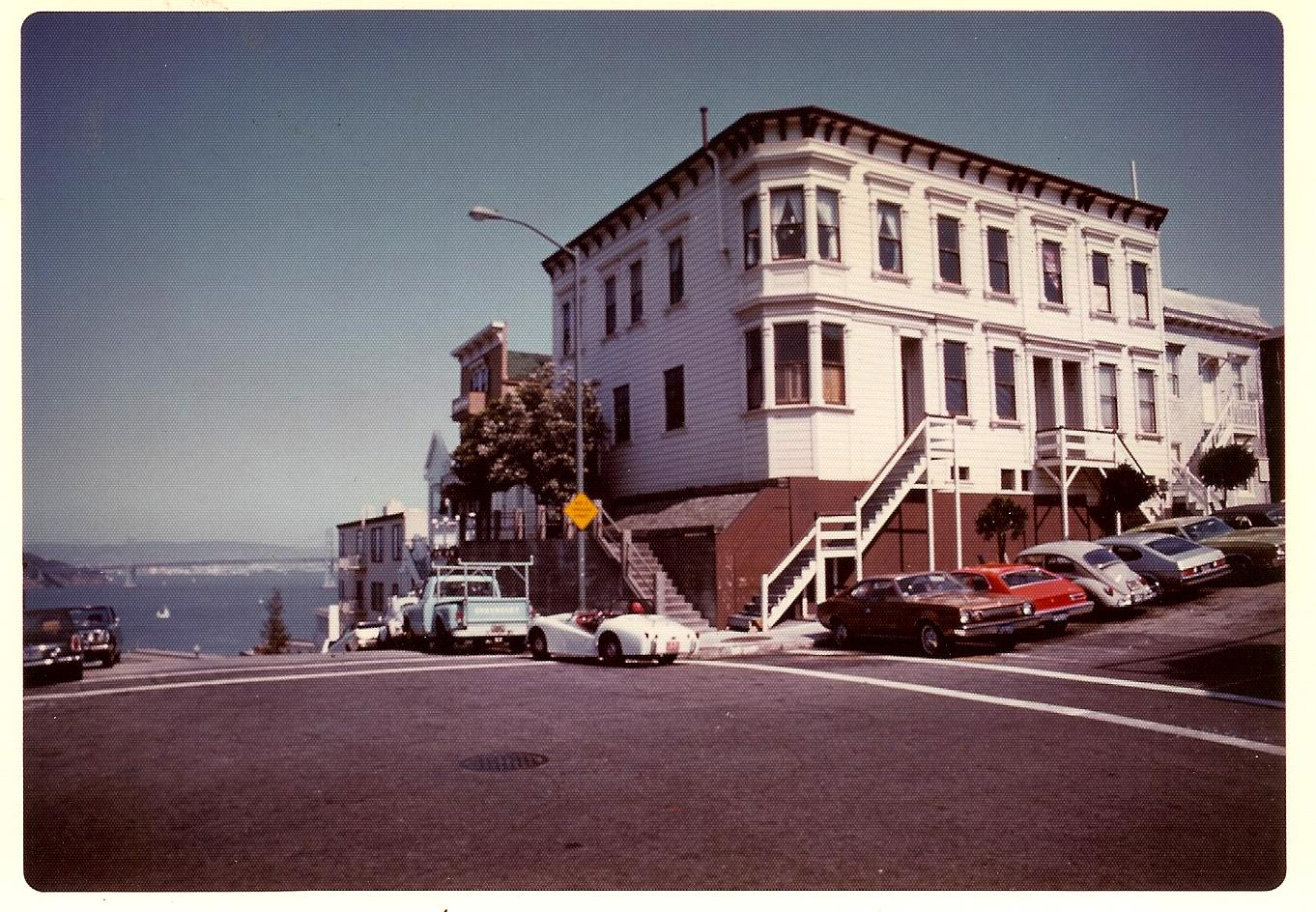
1256 Montgomery - 1977

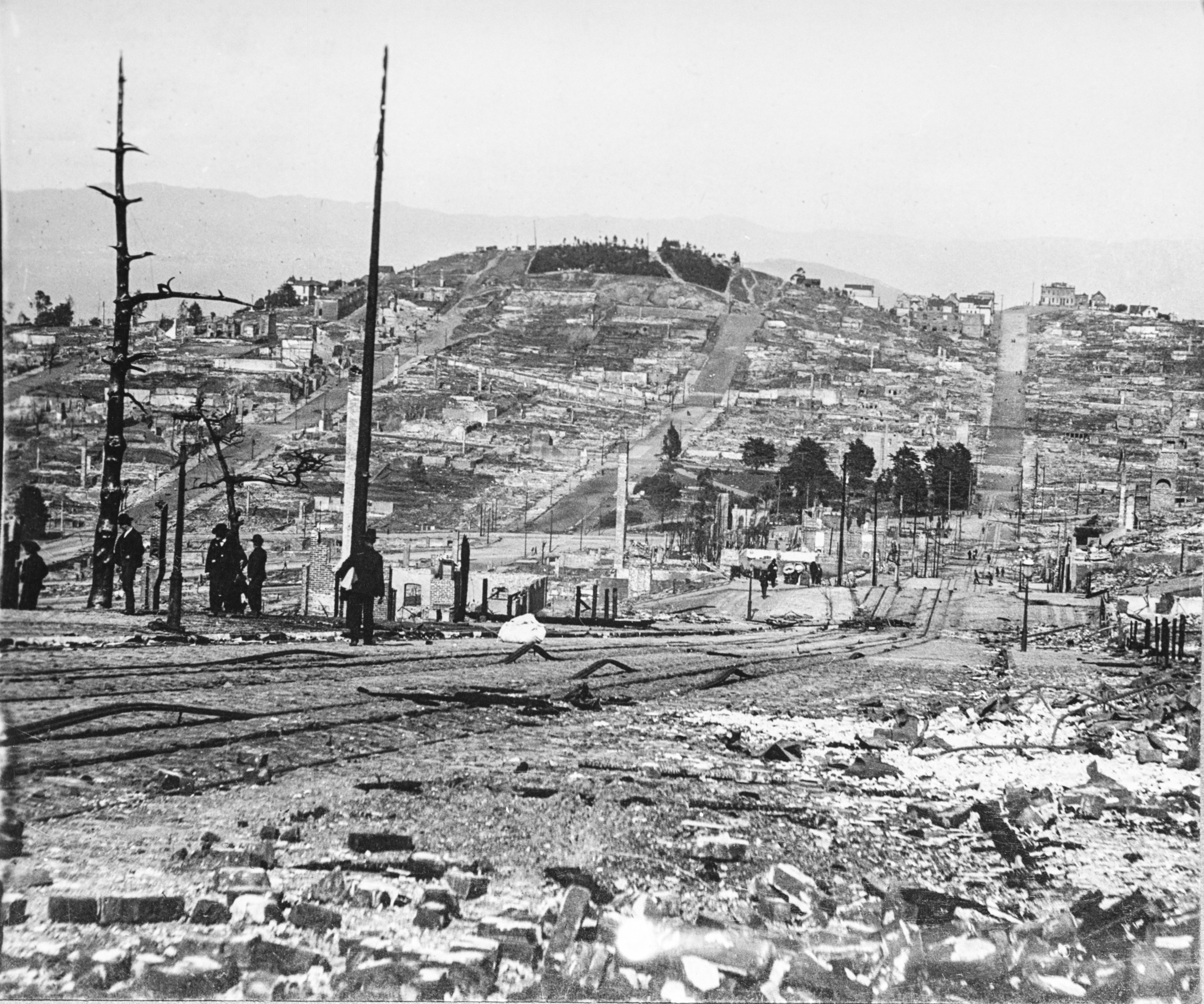
April - 1906

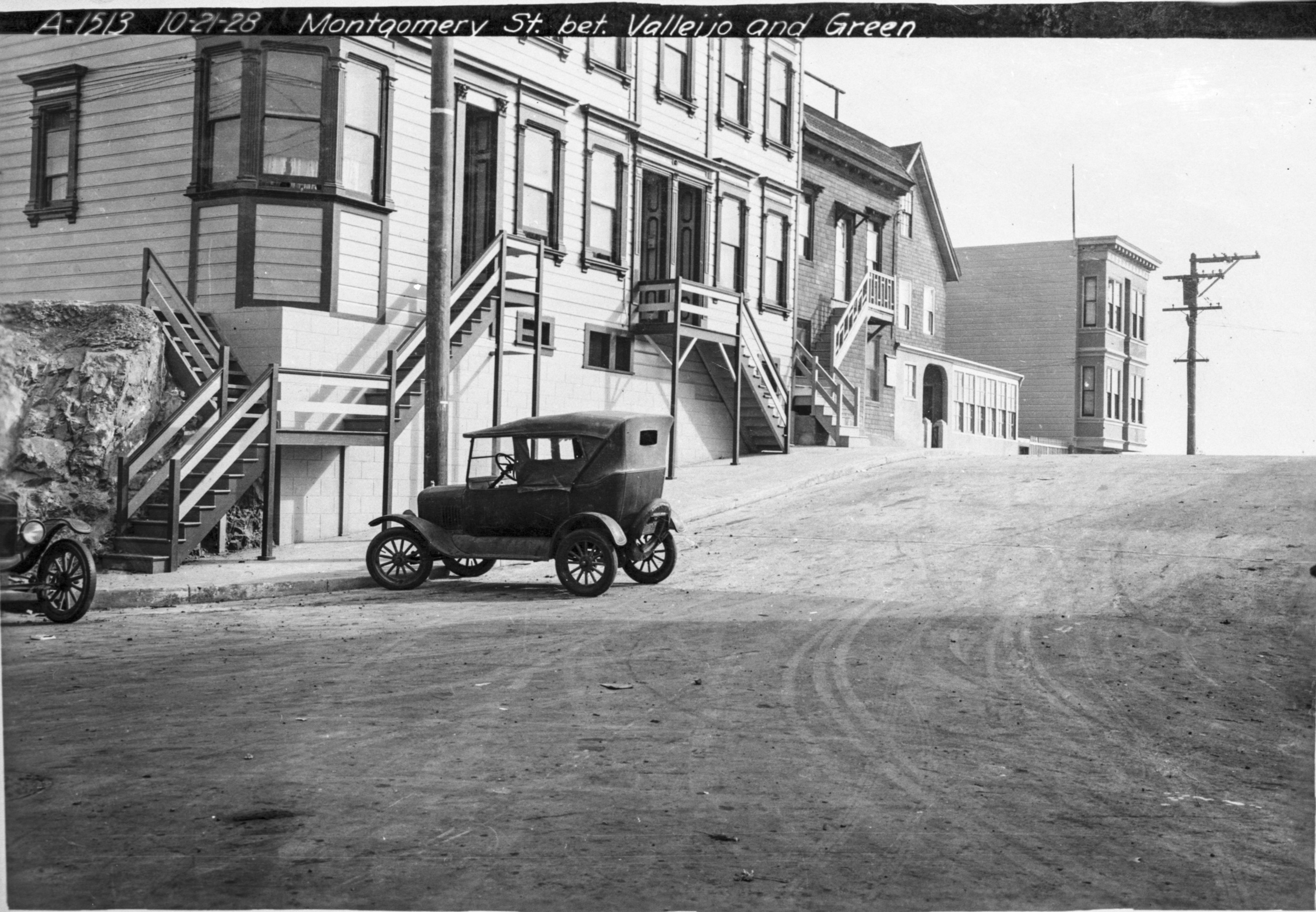
1256 Montgomery - 1920's

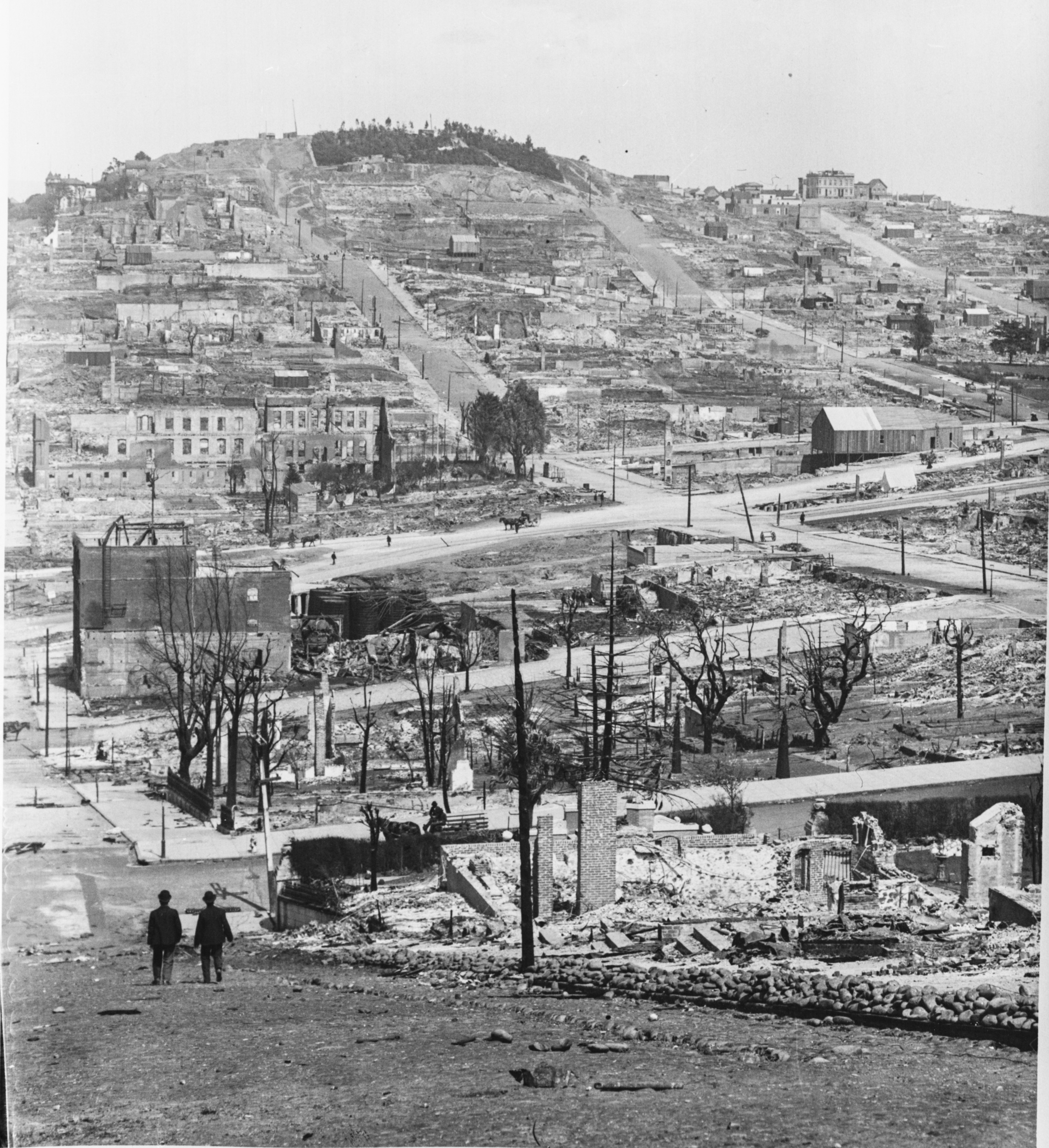
April 1906

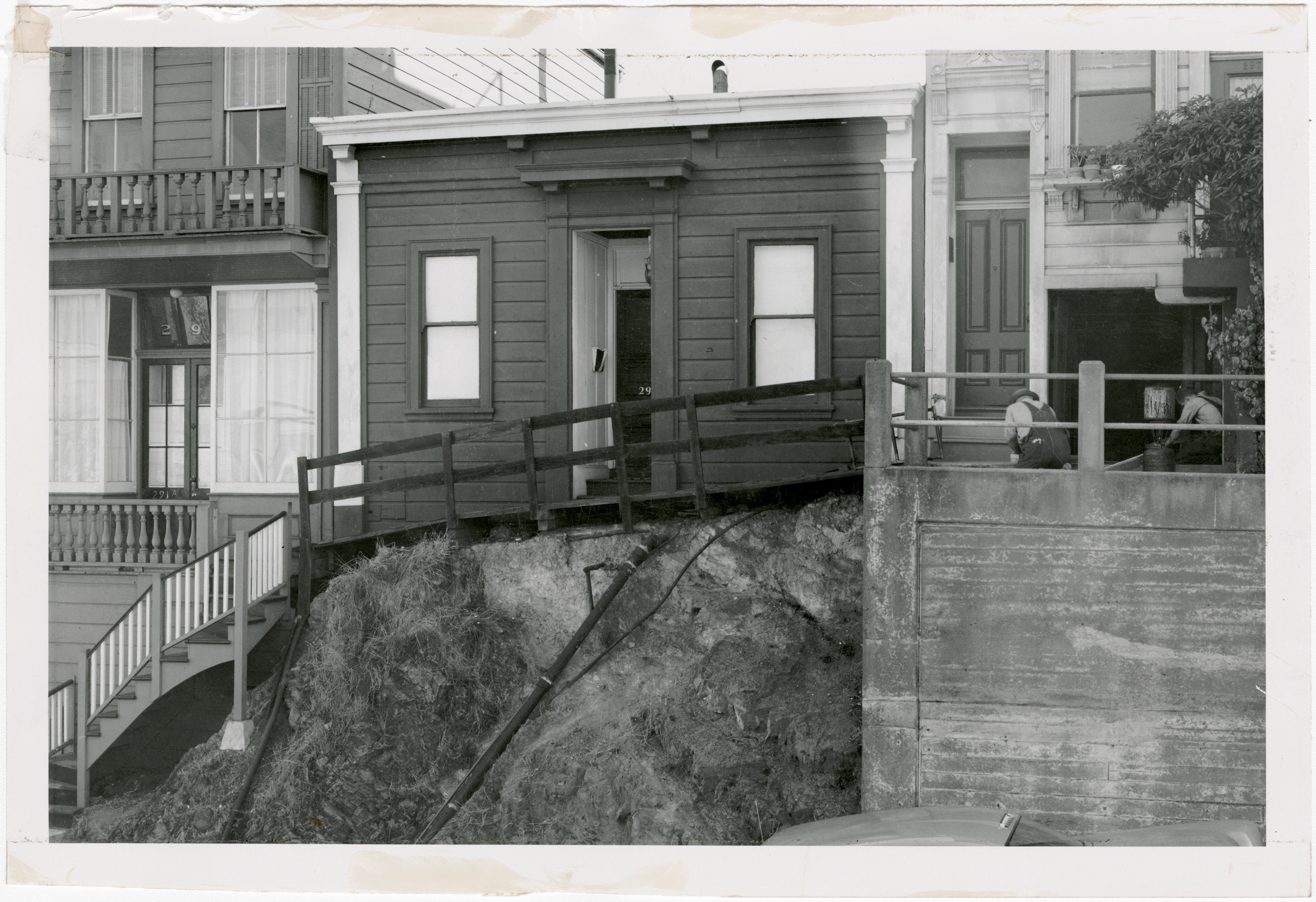
Corner of 1256 Montgmoery

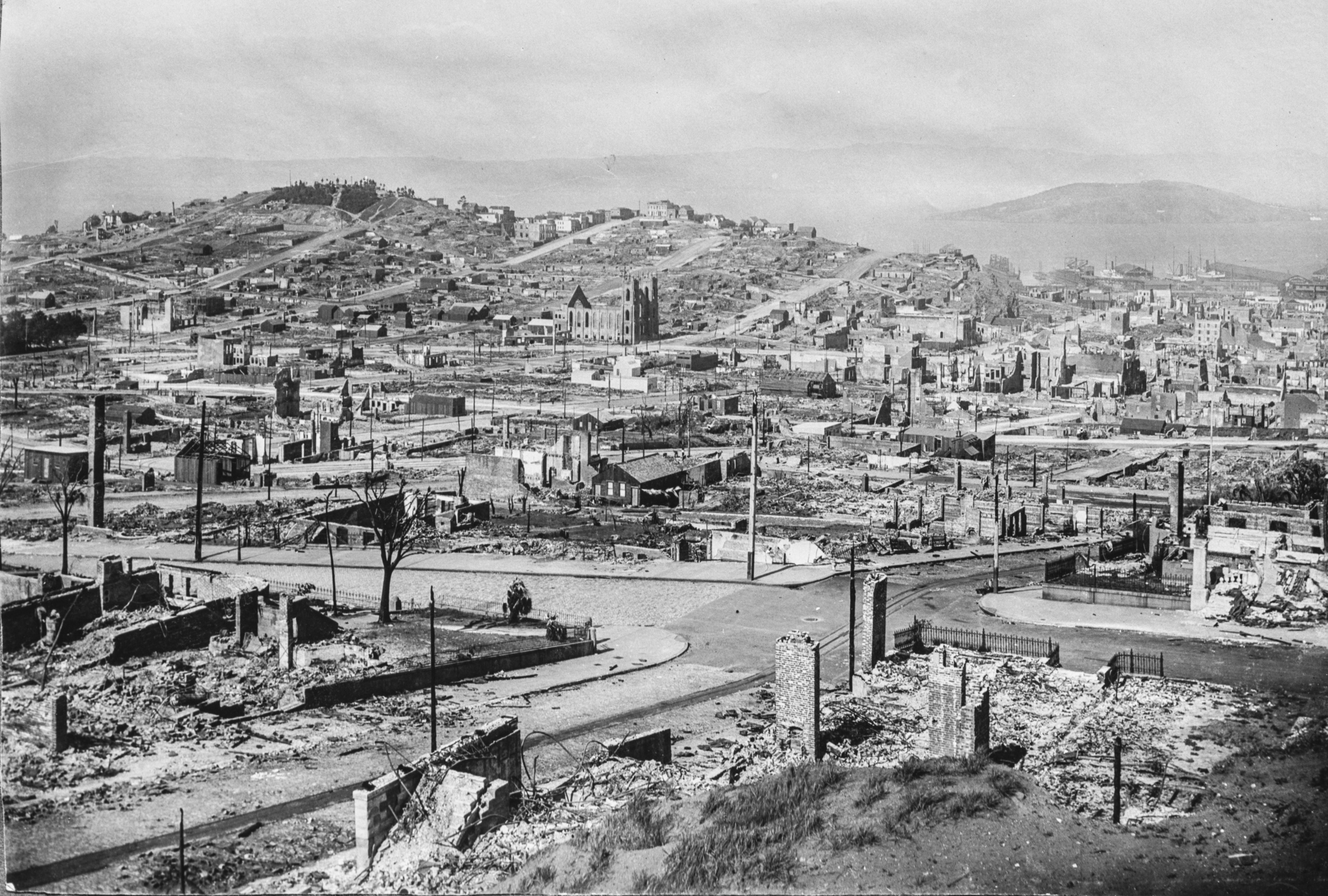
After April 1906

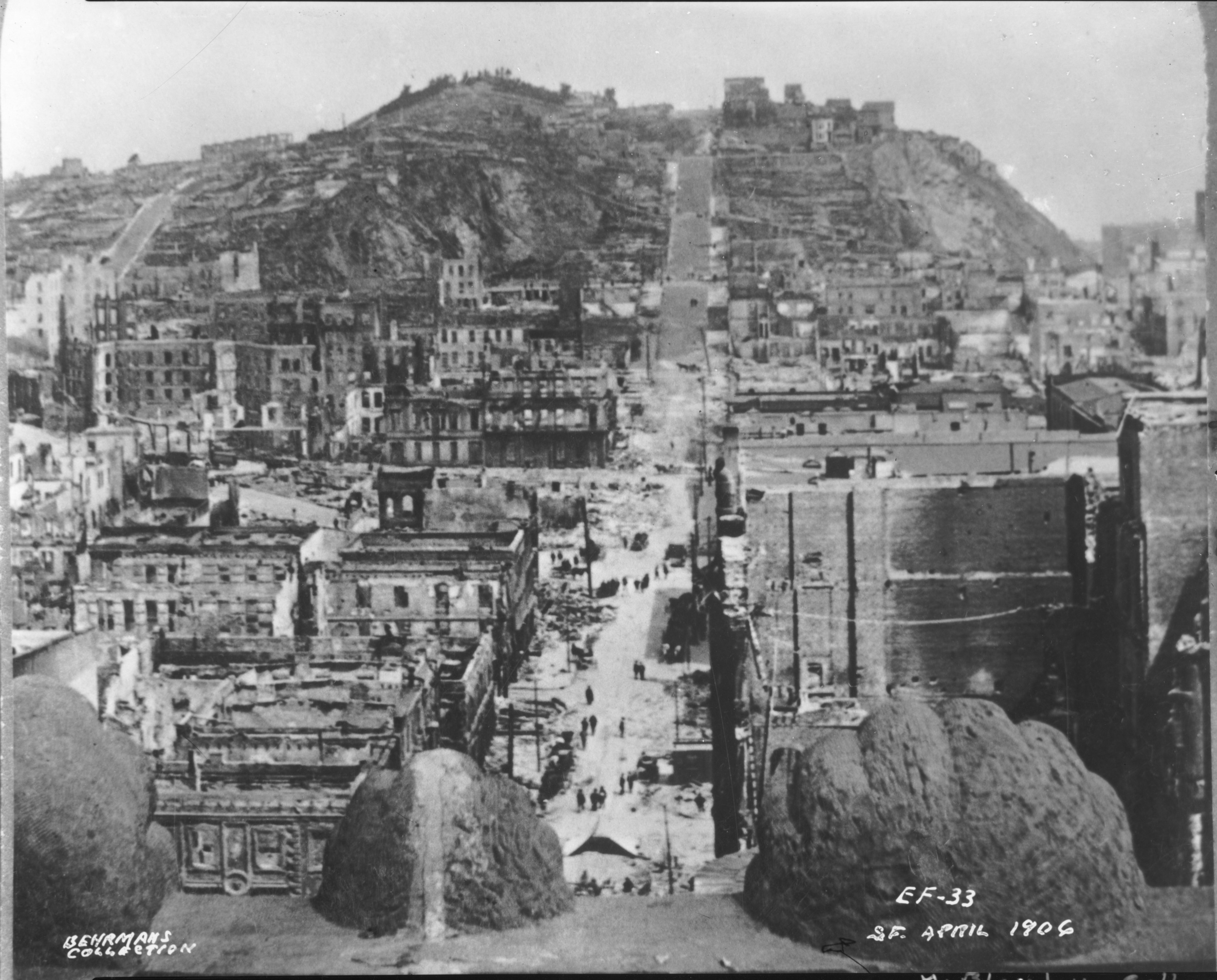
1256 Montgomery - Early 50s

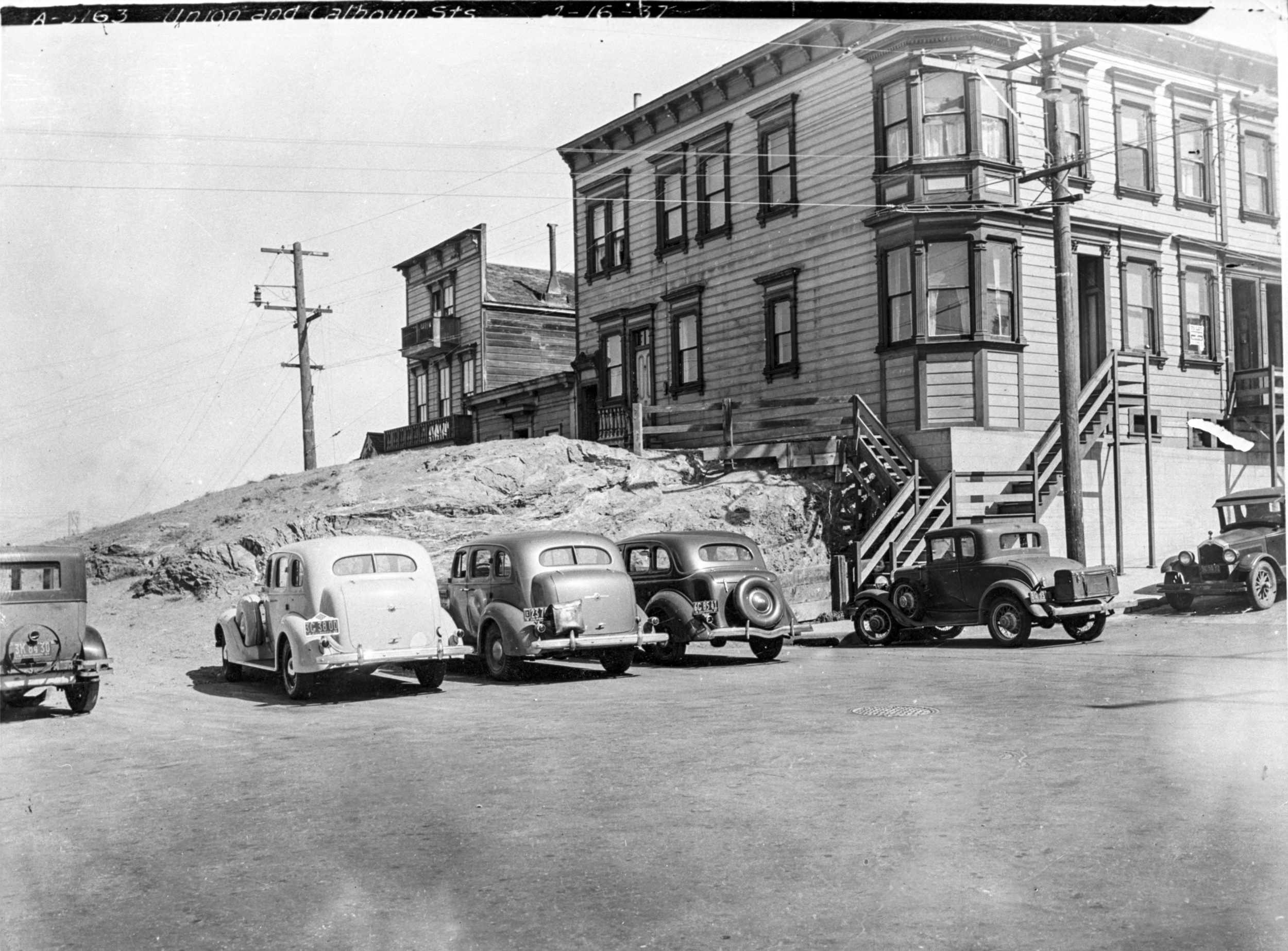
1256 Montgomery - 1930's
