= Armour & Co. Building =

- U.S. National Register of Historic Places
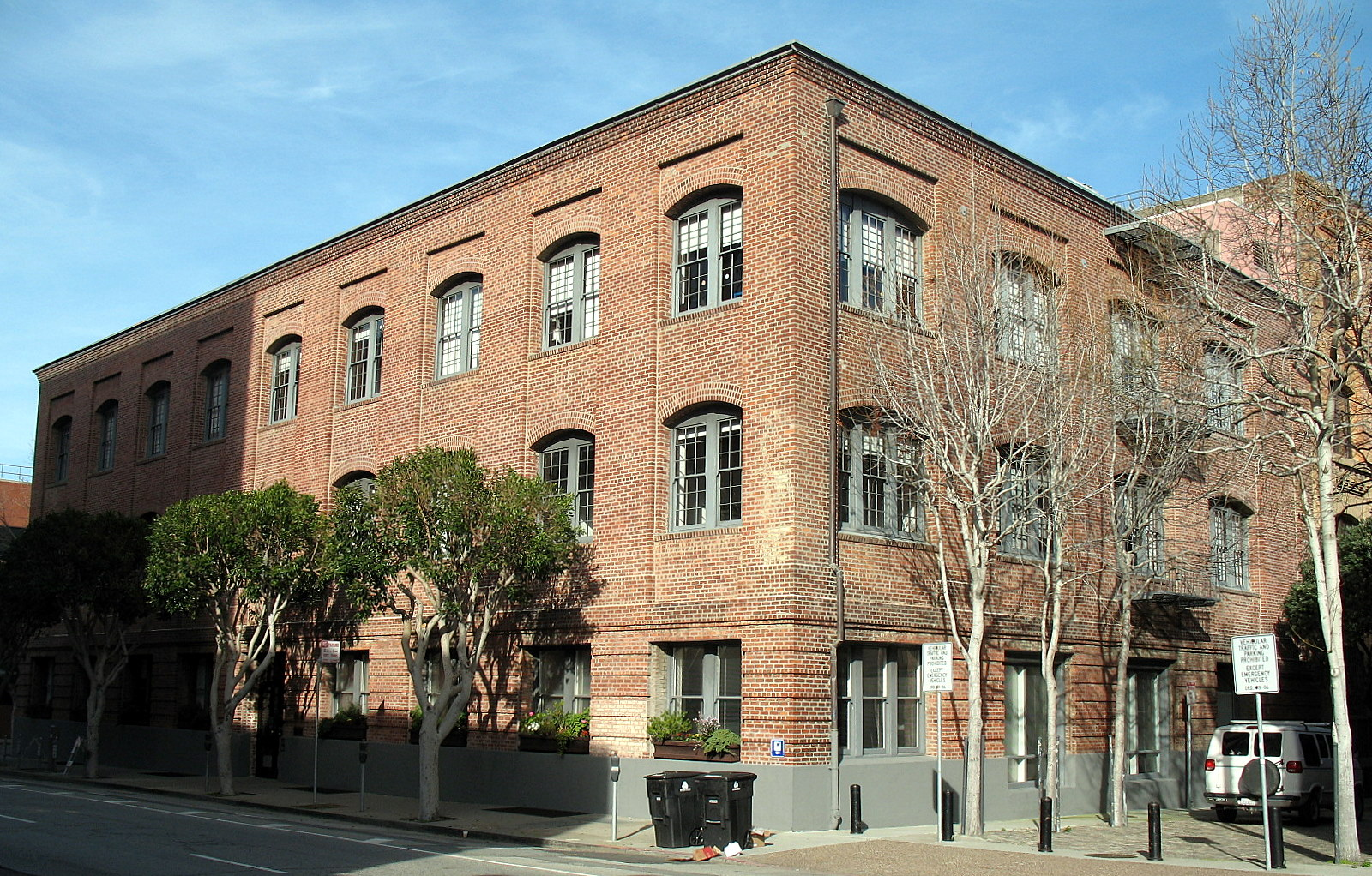

- Location within San Francisco County Location within California Location within the United States
- Location: 1050 Battery St., San Francisco, California
- Coordinates: 37°48′5″N 122°24′0″W
- Area: less than one acre
- Built: 1907
- Architects: Geilfuss, Henry & Son
- Architectural style: Italianate
- NRHP reference No.: 09001117
- Added to NRHP: December 22, 2009

The Armour & Co. Building is a historic building in San Francisco, California, United States, built for Armour and Company in 1907. It was listed on the U.S. National Register of Historic Places on December 22, 2009.

== Building ==
The Armour Building is a three-story brick building in the city's waterfront warehouse district. Its main entrance is on Battery Street; it also has a facade on Union Street. It was designed by Henry Geilfuss & Son, a prominent San Francisco architectural firm of the period, as a meat smoking and packing facility, and was built in 1907 in an Italianate style. The site was previously occupied by a 1902 American Milling Company warehouse, also designed by Geilfuss, which was destroyed in the 1906 earthquake and fire.

The building was provided with four smoke ovens in one corner of each floor, walled with brick and originally with steel doors, and otherwise was largely open; after Armour moved out of the building in 1934, office partitions were added beginning in 1944, when a new owner, V. Traverso Co., used it as a grocery warehouse, and the ovens were repurposed as conference rooms, storerooms, and restrooms. Employees' lunch and shower facilities and a test kitchen were created in the basement in 1979, and the loading docks have been converted to windows and an additional entrance. The building was also damaged by fire in 1940 and received seismic upgrades in the 1970s.
