= Stadtmuller House =

Historic house in San Francisco

- U.S. National Register of Historic Places
- California Historical Landmark
- San Francisco Designated Landmark
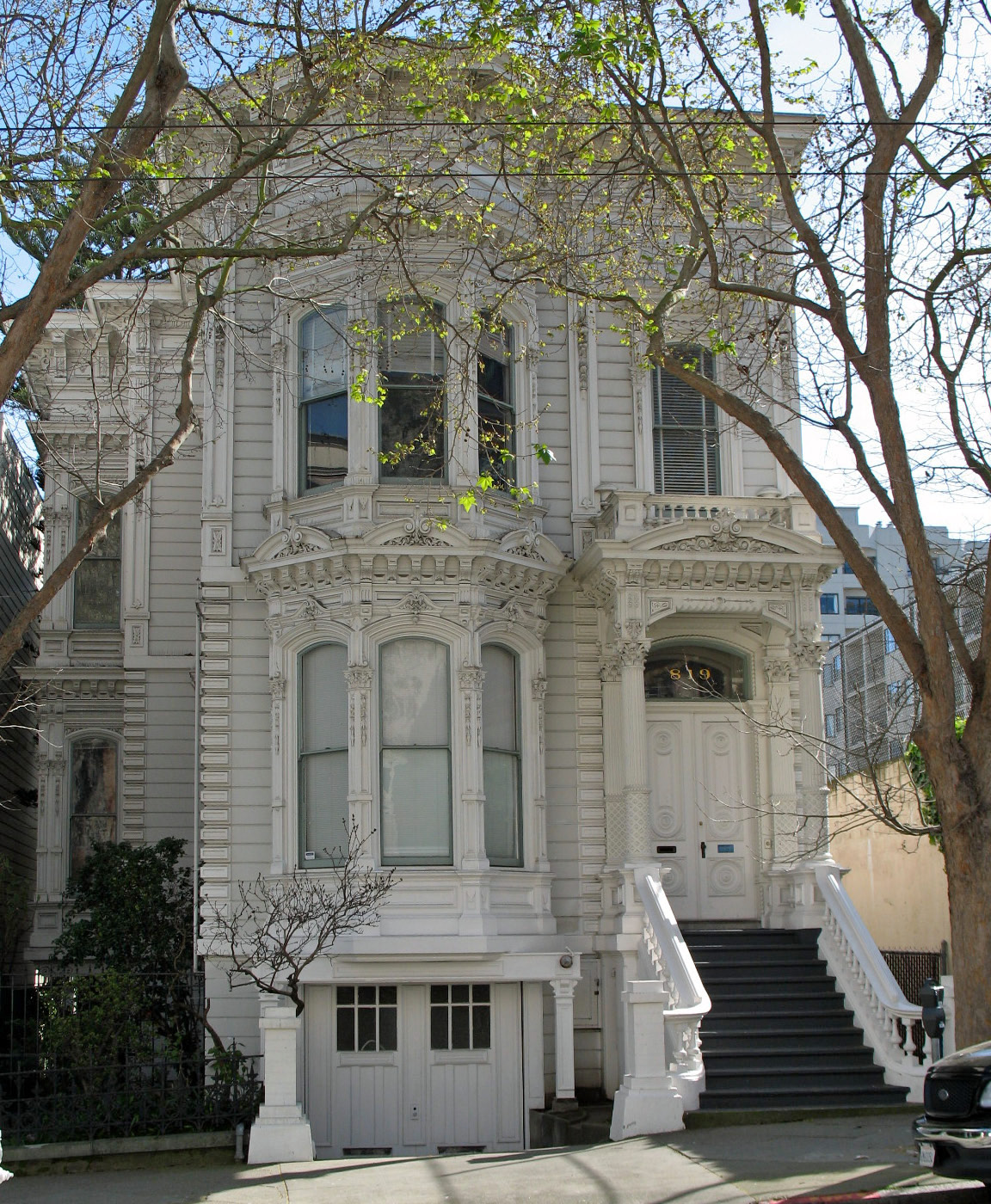

- Location within San Francisco County Location within California Location within the United States
- Location: 819 Eddy Street, San Francisco, California, 94109, U.S.
- Coordinates: 37.782793°N 122.421719°W
- Architect: Peter R. Schmidt
- Architectural style: Italianate
- NRHP reference No.: 76000523
- CHISL No.: N430
- SFDL No.: 35

Significant dates
- Added to NRHP: July 19, 1976
- Designated CHISL: July 19, 1976
- Designated SFDL: December 5, 1970

The Stadtmuller House, or F. D. Stadtmuller House, is a historic house built in 1880, and located in the Western Addition neighborhood of San Francisco, California. It is notable for its architecture.

The Stadtmuller House has been listed as a San Francisco Designated Landmark since December 5, 1970; a listed California Historical Landmark since July 19, 1976; and a National Register of Historic Places listed place since July 19, 1976.

== History ==
Stadtmuller House is located at 819 Eddy Street, San Francisco, California. The two-story house was built by architect Peter R. Schmidt in 1880, for German-born businessperson Frederick D. Stadtmuller (c. 1834–1893). It is an example of a late stage 19th-century Italianate architecture, with elaborate decoration, portico, and defined bay windows.

Stadtmuller had owned mercantile stores, named "Stadtmuller & Co." and he imported and sold timber and alcohol.

== See also ==
- List of San Francisco Designated Landmarks
- National Register of Historic Places listings in San Francisco
