= List of corporate disinformation website campaigns =

The following is a list of websites that have been created by companies and have been considered by journalists, fact-checkers or researchers as distributing false news - or otherwise participating in misinformation or disinformation.

== List ==
=== Alabama Power ===
| Name | Domain | Status | Notes | Sources |
|---|---|---|---|---|
| Alabama News Center | alabamanewscenter.com | Active | Founded by Alabama Power in 2015 and inspired by The Richmond Standard. Noted by The Guardian to have "overwhelmingly positive stories about [Alabama Power]", resulting in no news coverage by the outlet over environmental contamination by coal ash in Uniontown, Alabama, nor about repeated electric rate increases. During the 2010s and 2020s, many news reporters in major cities in Alabama had lost their jobs. According to Alabama Power's assistant treasurer, Brian George, the site is entirely funded by electricity customers in Alabama. According to Ike Pigott, Alabama Power communications strategist, the site is intended to stop the company's dependence on news outlets to spread its message. Does not disclose its ownership on articles that are spread by news outlets, Google News or Apple News. | |

=== All Perspectives Ltd. ===
| Name | Domain | Status | Notes | Sources |
|---|---|---|---|---|
| GB News | gbnews.com | Active | Promoted climate change denialism and repeatedly made false claims about COVID-19. | |

=== Banc de Binary ===
| Name | Domain | Status | Notes | Sources |
|---|---|---|---|---|
| cnn-trending.com | cnn-trending.com | Defunct | Imitated CNN.com, complete with the CNN logo. Pushed the Hawking Code scam. Domain expired. | |

=== Big News Network ===
The following is a list of websites run by Midwest Radio Network or The Mainstream Media, two affiliated organizations based in Australia and the United Kingdom, respectively, that are both owned by Big News Network, which is based in Dubai. These sites have been described as pink slime.

| Name | Domain | Status | Notes | Sources |
|---|---|---|---|---|
| Denmark Sun | | | | |
| Liverpool Star | | | | |
| Munich Metro | | | Describes itself as a "news bulletin from Bavaria", but does not include a local address or the names of local reporters. | |
| Northern Ireland News | | | | |
| Paris Guardian | | | | |
| Scandinavia Times | | | | |

=== Chevron ===
| Name | Domain | Status | Notes | Sources |
|---|---|---|---|---|
| Amazon Post | theamazonpost.com | Active | Based in Ecuador and operated by a public relations firm, Singer Associates, since 2009. Repeatedly attacked Steven Donziger due to lawsuits he filed against Chevron over oil drilling in Ecuador. Described on its website as promoting "Chevron's Views & Opinions on the Ecuador Lawsuit." Links to Juicio Crudo and El Oriente. | |
| El Oriente | eloriente.com | Active | Primarily targeting residents in the Ecuadorian Amazon, moved its disclaimer of Chevron funding from the bottom to the top of the webpage after contact by NPR and Floodlight. Links to the Amazon Post and Juicio Crudo. | |
| Juicio Crudo | juiciocrudo.com | Active | Focuses its coverage primarily on the lawsuit that Chevron had lost in Ecuador in 2011. Republishes press releases from Chevron in Spanish. Links to the Amazon Post and El Oriente. | |
| Permian Proud | permianproud.com | Active | Fully funded by Chevron. Accused by Gizmodo of having its purpose be "to help Chevron disseminate greenwashing information about the company," with NPR noting that many articles on its website appeared to be a corporate press release. Described by The Guardian as "a mixture of local news and propaganda". Author bylines are hidden in the website source code. One of the authors worked at a public relations firm as of 2022, and had previously written for The Richmond Standard. The geographic region that the website covers, the Permian Basin, has little-to-no news coverage in its Texas counties as of 2022. | |
| Richmond Standard | richmondstandard.com | Active | Funded and fully owned by Chevron, and operated by a public relations firm, Singer Associates. One of the authors worked at Singer Associates as of 2022, and also writes for Permian Proud. Described by NPR and Floodlight as "consistently [toeing] the company line [about Chevron]" and an extension of a news desert in Richmond, California - a "news mirage" – where "stories are told — but with an agenda." Criticized for failing to report on a February 2021 pipeline rupture and November 2023 refinery flare that had polluted the air and water of the San Francisco Bay Area. Also criticized by the Los Angeles Times for not fully showing its funding disclaimer. Accused by local residents of being a "public relations response" to the 2012 fire at the Chevron Richmond Refinery. Miranda Green of Floodlight observed that the funding disclaimer appears on the homepage, but not on articles, which also do not disclose that the author works for Singer Associates, concluding that "misinformation continues to be part of the system." Accused by David Folkenflik of NPR of misleading framing and context omission by describing a air pollution lawsuit settlement as a mutual agreement. | |

=== Dietary supplement marketers ===
Starting in 2011, the Federal Trade Commission, along with the State of Connecticut, filed complaints against several dietary supplement marketers, accusing them of creating fake news websites to advertise their products. Companies named in the lawsuits include Beony International, LeadClick Media, CoreLogic, LeanSpa, Sensa, L'Occitane, HCG Diet Direct, Sale Slash, Purists Choice, and Prisma Profits. The following is a list of websites promoted by these companies.

| Name | Domain | Status | Notes | Sources |
|---|---|---|---|---|
| consumers6-report.com | consumers6-report.com | | | |
| News 6 News Alerts | | | | |
| Health News Health Alerts | | | | |
| Health 5 Beat Health News | | | | |
| channel8health.com | channel8health.com | | | |
| dailyhealth6.com | dailyhealth6.com | | | |
| online6health.com | online6health.com | | | |
| diet.com-wb4.net | diet.com-wb4.net | | | |
| diet.com-8s9.net | diet.com-8s9.net | | | |
| healthconsumerreviews.com | healthconsumerreviews.com | | | |
| healthlifestylereview.com | healthlifestylereview.com | | | |

=== Eliminalia ===
The following is a list of sites created by Eliminalia, a reputation management firm.

| Name | Domain | Status | Notes | Sources |
|---|---|---|---|---|
| 24-7france.fr | 24-7france.fr | | | |
| 24-horas-espana.es | 24-horas-espana.es | | | |
| 24horas-chile.cl | 24horas-chile.cl | | | |
| 24horas-Portugal.com | 24horas-Portugal.com | | | |
| 365foggia.net | 365foggia.net | | | |
| 365genova.net | 365genova.net | | | |
| 365informations.com | 365informations.com | | | |
| 365parma.net | 365parma.net | | | |
| 365verona.net | 365verona.net | | | |
| 5minutes-France.com | 5minutes-France.com | | | |
| a-capital365.com | a-capital365.com | | | |
| abc-financier-paris.com | abc-financier-paris.com | | | |
| abc-morning.uk | abc-morning.uk | | | |
| actualites-nouvelles.net | actualites-nouvelles.net | | | |
| actualitesfrance24.fr | actualitesfrance24.fr | | | |
| adn24-France.com | adn24-France.com | | | |
| Africa-daily.com | Africa-daily.com | | | |
| Africa-nation.com | Africa-nation.com | | | |
| African-morning.com | African-morning.com | | | |
| afrique-libre.com | afrique-libre.com | | | |
| Algerie-independante.com | Algerie-independante.com | | | |
| American-newspeper.us | American-newspeper.us | | | |
| American-press24.us | American-press24.us | | | |
| American-time-news.us | American-time-news.us | | | |
| analise-informativa.com | analise-informativa.com | | | |
| analyse-informative.com | analyse-informative.com | | | |
| anarando.com | anarando.com | | | |
| annotrecentogiorni.com | annotrecentogiorni.com | | | |
| appledailytaiwan.com | appledailytaiwan.com | | | |
| approche-sociale.com | approche-sociale.com | | | |
| argumentos24-7.cl | argumentos24-7.cl | | | |
| argumentos24-7.es | argumentos24-7.es | | | |
| argumentos365.cl | argumentos365.cl | | | |
| arguments365.Asia | arguments365.Asia | | | |
| argumentua.com.ua | argumentua.com.ua | | | |
| argumenty.com.ua | argumenty.com.ua | | | |
| automobiliecase.com | automobiliecase.com | | | |
| avantiilmondo.it | avantiilmondo.it | | | |
| avtoprom-uk.com.ua | avtoprom-uk.com.ua | | | |
| banca-news.com | banca-news.com | | | |
| beautoftcountr.org | beautoftcountr.org | | | |
| bellaitalia2021.com | bellaitalia2021.com | | | |
| beyond-the-news.uk | beyond-the-news.uk | | | |
| beyond-the-truth.uk | beyond-the-truth.uk | | | |
| birodelpaese.it | birodelpaese.it | | | |
| biznes-portal.com.ua | biznes-portal.com.ua | | | |
| biznessvit.com | biznessvit.com | | | |
| bolognalibero.net | bolognalibero.net | | | |
| bolzanoinrepubblica.net | bolzanoinrepubblica.net | | | |
| brkfstnews.com | brkfstnews.com | | | |
| buddyloan.com | buddyloan.com | | | |
| bulletin-dinformation-paris24.fr | bulletin-dinformation-paris24.fr | | | |
| calmnews.taipei | calmnews.taipei | | | |
| caltanissettainrepubblica.net | caltanissettainrepubblica.net | | | |
| cause-et-effet.net | cause-et-effet.net | | | |
| causeeteffet.net | causeeteffet.net | | | |
| celebre.live | celebre.live | | | |
| centro-de-Mexico.mx | centro-de-Mexico.mx | | | |
| changer-France.com | changer-France.com | | | |
| channel-africa24-7.net | channel-africa24-7.net | | | |
| Chicago-newspaper.us | Chicago-newspaper.us | | | |
| Chicago-star24.us | Chicago-star24.us | | | |
| chile-directo24.cl | chile-directo24.cl | | | |
| chile-statements.cl | chile-statements.cl | | | |
| china-news10.com | china-news10.com | | | |
| chinadailynews-tw.com | chinadailynews-tw.com | | | |
| chronique-France.com | chronique-France.com | | | |
| ciclopatas.com | ciclopatas.com | | | |
| circulo-mexicano.mx | circulo-mexicano.mx | | | |
| citizen-movement.uk | citizen-movement.uk | | | |
| ciudad-de-Mexico.mx | ciudad-de-Mexico.mx | | | |
| cnnewstoday.com | cnnewstoday.com | | | |
| Colombia-hoy.co | Colombia-hoy.co | | | |
| Colombia-noticias24.co | Colombia-noticias24.co | | | |
| colonna-diragguaglio.it | colonna-diragguaglio.it | | | |
| comissao-de-verdade.com | comissao-de-verdade.com | | | |
| computer-news.it | computer-news.it | | | |
| comunicato-informativo.it | comunicato-informativo.it | | | |
| comunicazione-d-Italia.it | comunicazione-d-Italia.it | | | |
| confidentiel24.net | confidentiel24.net | | | |
| contemporary-society.uk | contemporary-society.uk | | | |
| correio-do-Portugal.com | correio-do-Portugal.com | | | |
| correo-nacional.cl | correo-nacional.cl | | | |
| correo-nacional.es | correo-nacional.es | | | |
| cosapensi.com | cosapensi.com | | | |
| cote-d-Ivoire24-7.com | cote-d-Ivoire24-7.com | | | |
| country-today24.uk | country-today24.uk | | | |
| cronachedelmomento.it | cronachedelmomento.it | | | |
| cuillere-informative-France.com | cuillere-informative-France.com | | | |
| culture-du-Gabon.com | culture-du-Gabon.com | | | |
| current-press-london.uk | current-press-london.uk | | | |
| cutenews.taipei | cutenews.taipei | | | |
| dailyworld.Asia | dailyworld.Asia | | | |
| dearfrd.com | dearfrd.com | | | |
| democratique-Congo.net | democratique-Congo.net | | | |
| democresia-24h.cl | democresia-24h.cl | | | |
| democresia-24h.es | democresia-24h.es | | | |
| derniere-minute-France.com | derniere-minute-France.com | | | |
| derniereheure.fr | derniereheure.fr | | | |
| details24-7.Asia | details24-7.Asia | | | |
| diario-Colombia.co | diario-Colombia.co | | | |
| diario-del-sur24.co | diario-del-sur24.co | | | |
| diario-digital24-7.com | diario-digital24-7.com | | | |
| diario-oficial.mx | diario-oficial.mx | | | |
| diario-publico.cl | diario-publico.cl | | | |
| diario-publico.com | diario-publico.com | | | |
| diario-publico.es | diario-publico.es | | | |
| digital-seminar.uk | digital-seminar.uk | | | |
| dilovyj-svit.com | dilovyj-svit.com | | | |
| dilovyj.com.ua | dilovyj.com.ua | | | |
| dispacciodelnord.it | dispacciodelnord.it | | | |
| dosyagnennya.com.ua | dosyagnennya.com.ua | | | |
| dzerkalo-tyzhnya.com.ua | dzerkalo-tyzhnya.com.ua | | | |
| eac-news.com | eac-news.com | | | |
| echelle-informative.net | echelle-informative.net | | | |
| echo-informatif.com | echo-informatif.com | | | |
| ednajmosya.com | ednajmosya.com | | | |
| ekonomichnyj-portal.com | ekonomichnyj-portal.com | | | |
| ekonomika-Ukraine.com.ua | ekonomika-Ukraine.com.ua | | | |
| el-colombiano.co | el-colombiano.co | | | |
| el-colombiano365.co | el-colombiano365.co | | | |
| el-diario365.es | el-diario365.es | | | |
| el-espanol247.es | el-espanol247.es | | | |
| el-independiente.cl | el-independiente.cl | | | |
| el-independiente.es | el-independiente.es | | | |
| el-informador24-7.co | el-informador24-7.co | | | |
| el-mexicano24-7.mx | el-mexicano24-7.mx | | | |
| el-mundo365.es | el-mundo365.es | | | |
| el-pais365.es | el-pais365.es | | | |
| el-sol-de-mexico365.mx | el-sol-de-mexico365.mx | | | |
| el-tiempo-diario.co | el-tiempo-diario.co | | | |
| el-tiempo-espana.es | el-tiempo-espana.es | | | |
| elcolombiano-diario.co | elcolombiano-diario.co | | | |
| elcorreopostal.com | elcorreopostal.com | | | |
| elecuadordehoy.com | elecuadordehoy.com | | | |
| elnacional-actualidad.com | elnacional-actualidad.com | | | |
| elpais-Colombia.co | elpais-Colombia.co | | | |
| elsol-Colombia.co | elsol-Colombia.co | | | |
| eltiempo-Ecuador.com | eltiempo-Ecuador.com | | | |
| enfoque-social.cl | enfoque-social.cl | | | |
| English-society24.uk | English-society24.uk | | | |
| entrepriseinternet.com | entrepriseinternet.com | | | |
| envio-telegrafo.com | envio-telegrafo.com | | | |
| eoftdragon.com | eoftdragon.com | | | |
| equipederecherche.fr | equipederecherche.fr | | | |
| espana-independiente.es | espana-independiente.es | | | |
| espressonotizie.it | espressonotizie.it | | | |
| estado-espanol.es | estado-espanol.es | | | |
| estrella-de-espana.es | estrella-de-espana.es | | | |
| estrella-uruguaya24.net | estrella-uruguaya24.net | | | |
| estrella365.cl | estrella365.cl | | | |
| eventos-incriveis.com | eventos-incriveis.com | | | |
| express-london.uk | express-london.uk | | | |
| express-peterburg.com | express-peterburg.com | | | |
| expressitaliano.com | expressitaliano.com | | | |
| fintech-Ecuador.com | fintech-Ecuador.com | | | |
| firenzeinrepubblica.net | firenzeinrepubblica.net | | | |
| foglidelnord.it | foglidelnord.it | | | |
| foodforanimal.com | foodforanimal.com | | | |
| foodforanimals.us | foodforanimals.us | | | |
| footballtransfermarkt.com | footballtransfermarkt.com | | | |
| fortenews.it | fortenews.it | | | |
| forum-alimentaire.fr | forum-alimentaire.fr | | | |
| forumauto.online | forumauto.online | | | |
| forummusicale.it | forummusicale.it | | | |
| France-actuelle.com | France-actuelle.com | | | |
| France-degre-zero.com | France-degre-zero.com | | | |
| France-derniere-7-24.fr | France-derniere-7-24.fr | | | |
| France-nouveau-regard.com | France-nouveau-regard.com | | | |
| France-pointdevue.com | France-pointdevue.com | | | |
| franceendirect.com | franceendirect.com | | | |
| francemoderne24.com | francemoderne24.com | | | |
| freecronaca.it | freecronaca.it | | | |
| fromchwithl.com | fromchwithl.com | | | |
| frontiere-informationnelle.net | frontiere-informationnelle.net | | | |
| gazzetta-dioggi.net | gazzetta-dioggi.net | | | |
| gazzettabari.net | gazzettabari.net | | | |
| gazzettadelvespro.com | gazzettadelvespro.com | | | |
| gazzettaoggi.net | gazzettaoggi.net | | | |
| generation-london.uk | generation-london.uk | | | |
| genestoso.com | genestoso.com | | | |
| giornalesettentrione.it | giornalesettentrione.it | | | |
| giornalismodimetropoli.it | giornalismodimetropoli.it | | | |
| glory-Ukraine.com.ua | glory-Ukraine.com.ua | | | |
| gmtaiwan.com | gmtaiwan.com | | | |
| golos-krajiny.com.ua | golos-krajiny.com.ua | | | |
| gromadske.com | gromadske.com | | | |
| guangzhou-new.com | guangzhou-new.com | | | |
| guayaquil2025.com | guayaquil2025.com | | | |
| handnews.Asia | handnews.Asia | | | |
| hapgoose.com | hapgoose.com | | | |
| hello-taipei.com | hello-taipei.com | | | |
| hellochin.com | hellochin.com | | | |
| hellomoscu.com | hellomoscu.com | | | |
| heraldo-de-mexico365.mx | heraldo-de-mexico365.mx | | | |
| heure-des-nouvelles.com | heure-des-nouvelles.com | | | |
| homme-entreprenant.com | homme-entreprenant.com | | | |
| hora-en-Ecuador.com | hora-en-Ecuador.com | | | |
| horizons-realite.net | horizons-realite.net | | | |
| hosognato.net | hosognato.net | | | |
| hoy-barcelona.es | hoy-barcelona.es | | | |
| hoy-urugua.net | hoy-urugua.net | | | |
| hoy24-7.cl | hoy24-7.cl | | | |
| idees-France.com | idees-France.com | | | |
| ilcorrieremeridionale.it | ilcorrieremeridionale.it | | | |
| ilgazzettinomilano.com | ilgazzettinomilano.com | | | |
| ilgazzettinopisa.com | ilgazzettinopisa.com | | | |
| ilgazzettinorimini.com | ilgazzettinorimini.com | | | |
| ilgazzettinosicilia.com | ilgazzettinosicilia.com | | | |
| ilgazzettinotaranto.com | ilgazzettinotaranto.com | | | |
| ilgazzettinoudine.com | ilgazzettinoudine.com | | | |
| ilgazzettinoveneto.com | ilgazzettinoveneto.com | | | |
| ilgiornoreggionale.it | ilgiornoreggionale.it | | | |
| ilmessaggerorepubblicano.it | ilmessaggerorepubblicano.it | | | |
| ilmondodimeridione.it | ilmondodimeridione.it | | | |
| ilsognodeldemos.com | ilsognodeldemos.com | | | |
| inchiostropadano.it | inchiostropadano.it | | | |
| independent-usa.us | independent-usa.us | | | |
| info-fakty.com.ua | info-fakty.com.ua | | | |
| inforesurs.com | inforesurs.com | | | |
| informacion-colombia24-7.co | informacion-colombia24-7.co | | | |
| informacion-diaria.com | informacion-diaria.com | | | |
| informacion-mexicana.mx | informacion-mexicana.mx | | | |
| information-populaire.com | information-populaire.com | | | |
| information-portal.uk | information-portal.uk | | | |
| information-securisee.net | information-securisee.net | | | |
| information-seminar.uk | information-seminar.uk | | | |
| informations-guinee.com | informations-guinee.com | | | |
| informative-order.uk | informative-order.uk | | | |
| informative-uk.uk | informative-uk.uk | | | |
| informatore-italiano24.it | informatore-italiano24.it | | | |
| informatyvne.com | informatyvne.com | | | |
| interfax24.com | interfax24.com | | | |
| internet-6g.com | internet-6g.com | | | |
| jiefang-china.com | jiefang-china.com | | | |
| jour-apres-jour.net | jour-apres-jour.net | | | |
| journal-d-actualite-24.com | journal-d-actualite-24.com | | | |
| journal-noncensure.net | journal-noncensure.net | | | |
| journaliste-quotidien.com | journaliste-quotidien.com | | | |
| joursfrance.fr | joursfrance.fr | | | |
| keyoftruth.Asia | keyoftruth.Asia | | | |
| khreshatyk.com | khreshatyk.com | | | |
| kommersant10.com | kommersant10.com | | | |
| komsomolets-vesti.com | komsomolets-vesti.com | | | |
| komsomolskaya-news.com | komsomolskaya-news.com | | | |
| krainaonline.com | krainaonline.com | | | |
| kyiv-post.com.ua | kyiv-post.com.ua | | | |
| l-economiste.com | l-economiste.com | | | |
| l-expansion-France.com | l-expansion-France.com | | | |
| l-exposant-francais.com | l-exposant-francais.com | | | |
| l-horizonte.com | l-horizonte.com | | | |
| l-observateur-France.com | l-observateur-France.com | | | |
| l-opinion-France.com | l-opinion-France.com | | | |
| l-universel-paris.com | l-universel-paris.com | | | |
| la-cronica365.co | la-cronica365.co | | | |
| la-estrella-mexicana.mx | la-estrella-mexicana.mx | | | |
| la-France-moderne.com | la-France-moderne.com | | | |
| la-opinion-Colombia.co | la-opinion-Colombia.co | | | |
| la-patria-Colombia.co | la-patria-Colombia.co | | | |
| la-provincia24-7.cl | la-provincia24-7.cl | | | |
| la-provincia24.es | la-provincia24.es | | | |
| la-raison-France.com | la-raison-France.com | | | |
| la-republica24-7.co | la-republica24-7.co | | | |
| la-republique-France.fr | la-republique-France.fr | | | |
| la-verite-France.com | la-verite-France.com | | | |
| la-voix-de-Algerie.org | la-voix-de-Algerie.org | | | |
| lacucina10.it | lacucina10.it | | | |
| lagaceta-ecuatoriana.com | lagaceta-ecuatoriana.com | | | |
| lanouvelle-marseillaise.fr | lanouvelle-marseillaise.fr | | | |
| lanuovaonde.it | lanuovaonde.it | | | |
| laprensa-ec.com | laprensa-ec.com | | | |
| laprimavoce.net | laprimavoce.net | | | |
| laprovince-francaise.fr | laprovince-francaise.fr | | | |
| larepubblica-news.it | larepubblica-news.it | | | |
| larepubica10.com | larepubica10.com | | | |
| larivainformativa.it | larivainformativa.it | | | |
| lasociete-moderne.com | lasociete-moderne.com | | | |
| lasocietemoderne.com | lasocietemoderne.com | | | |
| lastampaborea.it | lastampaborea.it | | | |
| lavant-garde-France.com | lavant-garde-France.com | | | |
| laverita.xyz | laverita.xyz | | | |
| lavocedelitalia.com | lavocedelitalia.com | | | |
| lavocedelmilano.com | lavocedelmilano.com | | | |
| lavocenazionale.it | lavocenazionale.it | | | |
| le-chercheur-paris.net | le-chercheur-paris.net | | | |
| le-dirigeant.com | le-dirigeant.com | | | |
| le-gardien.com | le-gardien.com | | | |
| le-heraut24-7.com | le-heraut24-7.com | | | |
| le-journaldumatin.net | le-journaldumatin.net | | | |
| le-journaliste7.com | le-journaliste7.com | | | |
| le-paradigme.com | le-paradigme.com | | | |
| le-progres-france24.fr | le-progres-france24.fr | | | |
| le-soleil-de-France.com | le-soleil-de-France.com | | | |
| le-statut-social.com | le-statut-social.com | | | |
| le-tribune.com | le-tribune.com | | | |
| lefigaromarsella.fr | lefigaromarsella.fr | | | |
| lemonde-France.fr | lemonde-France.fr | | | |
| lemondefrance.fr | lemondefrance.fr | | | |
| lequipefrancaise.fr | lequipefrancaise.fr | | | |
| letelegrammeparis.fr | letelegrammeparis.fr | | | |
| libero-sanminiato.com | libero-sanminiato.com | | | |
| libero-veneto.com | libero-veneto.com | | | |
| liberte-au-Benin.com | liberte-au-Benin.com | | | |
| liberteouverte.com | liberteouverte.com | | | |
| lider-mexicano.mx | lider-mexicano.mx | | | |
| ligaukr.com | ligaukr.com | | | |
| liverpool-news24.uk | liverpool-news24.uk | | | |
| london-modern-chronicle.uk | london-modern-chronicle.uk | | | |
| london-news24-7.uk | london-news24-7.uk | | | |
| london-news24.uk | london-news24.uk | | | |
| london-newtimes.uk | london-newtimes.uk | | | |
| london-uncensored.uk | london-uncensored.uk | | | |
| los-medios-uy.net | los-medios-uy.net | | | |
| lospecchiosettimanale.com | lospecchiosettimanale.com | | | |
| lostatodioggi.it | lostatodioggi.it | | | |
| ltn-news.com | ltn-news.com | | | |
| luxcharacters.com | luxcharacters.com | | | |
| made-in-France-365.fr | made-in-France-365.fr | | | |
| magazinedesport.com | magazinedesport.com | | | |
| manchester-news24.uk | manchester-news24.uk | | | |
| manifestodelsole.com | manifestodelsole.com | | | |
| matin-paris.com | matin-paris.com | | | |
| mayday-Washington.com | mayday-Washington.com | | | |
| meaningtodreams.com | meaningtodreams.com | | | |
| medios-de-Uruguay.com | medios-de-Uruguay.com | | | |
| meetpointnews.org | meetpointnews.org | | | |
| megazineusa.com | megazineusa.com | | | |
| metro-vesti.com | metro-vesti.com | | | |
| Mexico-star.mx | Mexico-star.mx | | | |
| millenaire-France.com | millenaire-France.com | | | |
| minuto-de-noticias.com | minuto-de-noticias.com | | | |
| mirrowoftsoul.org | mirrowoftsoul.org | | | |
| misecretosdehoy.com | misecretosdehoy.com | | | |
| momentos-especiais24.com | momentos-especiais24.com | | | |
| monde-international.fr | monde-international.fr | | | |
| monde-moderne.com | monde-moderne.com | | | |
| monde-sans-frontieres.net | monde-sans-frontieres.net | | | |
| moneynws.com | moneynws.com | | | |
| moskovskiye-novosti.com | moskovskiye-novosti.com | | | |
| moskovsky2025.com | moskovsky2025.com | | | |
| nacional-post365.cl | nacional-post365.cl | | | |
| namibian24-7.com | namibian24-7.com | | | |
| nashe-mistechko.com.ua | nashe-mistechko.com.ua | | | |
| nashe-ridne.com.ua | nashe-ridne.com.ua | | | |
| nashe-ukrainske.com | nashe-ukrainske.com | | | |
| natsionalni-novyny.com.ua | natsionalni-novyny.com.ua | | | |
| navkoloplanety.com | navkoloplanety.com | | | |
| nedelka.com.ua | nedelka.com.ua | | | |
| negotcooknews.com | negotcooknews.com | | | |
| newisland.taipei | newisland.taipei | | | |
| newmiamiday.com | newmiamiday.com | | | |
| news-american365.us | news-american365.us | | | |
| news-kenya365.net | news-kenya365.net | | | |
| news-london24.uk | news-london24.uk | | | |
| news-minute24-7.org | news-minute24-7.org | | | |
| news-minute24-7.uk | news-minute24-7.uk | | | |
| news-minute24-7.us | news-minute24-7.us | | | |
| newsletter-united-kingdom.uk | newsletter-united-kingdom.uk | | | |
| newspapereeuu.com | newspapereeuu.com | | | |
| newstaiwan.online | newstaiwan.online | | | |
| newyorkpost100.com | newyorkpost100.com | | | |
| nezalezhnyj.com | nezalezhnyj.com | | | |
| Nigeria-news24-7.net | Nigeria-news24-7.net | | | |
| norte-de-Mexico.mx | norte-de-Mexico.mx | | | |
| noticias-al-minuto.es | noticias-al-minuto.es | | | |
| noticias-animalesec.com | noticias-animalesec.com | | | |
| noticias-de-Colombia.co | noticias-de-Colombia.co | | | |
| noticias-expressas.com | noticias-expressas.com | | | |
| noticias-globales.cl | noticias-globales.cl | | | |
| noticias-minuto.cl | noticias-minuto.cl | | | |
| noticias24-7.es | noticias24-7.es | | | |
| notioaperta.com | notioaperta.com | | | |
| notizie-365.net | notizie-365.net | | | |
| notizie-bari.com | notizie-bari.com | | | |
| notizie-dioggi24.com | notizie-dioggi24.com | | | |
| notizie-italia365.net | notizie-italia365.net | | | |
| notizie-milano365.net | notizie-milano365.net | | | |
| notizie-roma.com | notizie-roma.com | | | |
| notizie-roma365.net | notizie-roma365.net | | | |
| notizie-salento365.net | notizie-salento365.net | | | |
| notizie-TV.com | notizie-TV.com | | | |
| notizie-venezia.com | notizie-venezia.com | | | |
| notizie-venezia365.net | notizie-venezia365.net | | | |
| notiziedellasera.com | notiziedellasera.com | | | |
| notizieintv.com | notizieintv.com | | | |
| notiziemilano-Italia.com | notiziemilano-Italia.com | | | |
| notizietuttigiorni.com | notizietuttigiorni.com | | | |
| nottingham-news24.uk | nottingham-news24.uk | | | |
| nourriture-emporter.com | nourriture-emporter.com | | | |
| nouvel-expresse.com | nouvel-expresse.com | | | |
| nouvelle-pensee-sociale.net | nouvelle-pensee-sociale.net | | | |
| nouvelle-pensee.com | nouvelle-pensee.com | | | |
| nouvelles-la-verite.com | nouvelles-la-verite.com | | | |
| nouvelles-millenaires.com | nouvelles-millenaires.com | | | |
| nouvelles-recentes.com | nouvelles-recentes.com | | | |
| o-pesquisador-lisboa.com | o-pesquisador-lisboa.com | | | |
| observer-la-France.com | observer-la-France.com | | | |
| obshestvo.com.ua | obshestvo.com.ua | | | |
| obviouslynews.org | obviouslynews.org | | | |
| oglyadach-pro.com | oglyadach-pro.com | | | |
| opiniao-publica.com | opiniao-publica.com | | | |
| opiniao-publica24-7.com | opiniao-publica24-7.com | | | |
| opinion-ecua.com | opinion-ecua.com | | | |
| opinion-mexicana.mx | opinion-mexicana.mx | | | |
| opinion-publique24.net | opinion-publique24.net | | | |
| opinion-uk.uk | opinion-uk.uk | | | |
| opinionsocial24-7.net | opinionsocial24-7.net | | | |
| opportunite-quotidienne.com | opportunite-quotidienne.com | | | |
| ostani-novyny.com | ostani-novyny.com | | | |
| palermolibero.net | palermolibero.net | | | |
| panneau-daffichage.com | panneau-daffichage.com | | | |
| paris-actualites.fr | paris-actualites.fr | | | |
| pas-a-pasfrance.com | pas-a-pasfrance.com | | | |
| peoples-voice24-7.org | peoples-voice24-7.org | | | |
| periodico24-7.com | periodico24-7.com | | | |
| periodicoiperboreo.it | periodicoiperboreo.it | | | |
| periodismo-mexicano.mx | periodismo-mexicano.mx | | | |
| pershi-visti.com | pershi-visti.com | | | |
| personajes-ec.com | personajes-ec.com | | | |
| personaprestigiosa.com | personaprestigiosa.com | | | |
| perspective-sociale.net | perspective-sociale.net | | | |
| perugiainrepubblica.net | perugiainrepubblica.net | | | |
| pescara-in-repubblica.net | pescara-in-repubblica.net | | | |
| pescarainrepubblica.net | pescarainrepubblica.net | | | |
| piattoinformativo.it | piattoinformativo.it | | | |
| pieofnews.com | pieofnews.com | | | |
| planeandnew.com | planeandnew.com | | | |
| podrobytsi.com.ua | podrobytsi.com.ua | | | |
| politicadeecuador.com | politicadeecuador.com | | | |
| politicienotizie.it | politicienotizie.it | | | |
| popular-lisboa.com | popular-lisboa.com | | | |
| Portugal-secreta.com | Portugal-secreta.com | | | |
| Portugal-socialista.com | Portugal-socialista.com | | | |
| post-izvestia.com | post-izvestia.com | | | |
| post-xinhua.com | post-xinhua.com | | | |
| pravdyvyj.com.ua | pravdyvyj.com.ua | | | |
| premiosecuador.com | premiosecuador.com | | | |
| prensa-Colombia.co | prensa-Colombia.co | | | |
| prensa-en-Uruguay.net | prensa-en-Uruguay.net | | | |
| prensa-online24-7.mx | prensa-online24-7.mx | | | |
| prensa-uruguaya.net | prensa-uruguaya.net | | | |
| prensaoro.com | prensaoro.com | | | |
| press-in-usa.us | press-in-usa.us | | | |
| presse-france7.fr | presse-france7.fr | | | |
| presse-universelle.com | presse-universelle.com | | | |
| prestigenews.Asia | prestigenews.Asia | | | |
| primeras-noticias.com | primeras-noticias.com | | | |
| prix2021.com | prix2021.com | | | |
| procaccianotizie.it | procaccianotizie.it | | | |
| progolovne24.com | progolovne24.com | | | |
| provadellostivale.com | provadellostivale.com | | | |
| provireni-fakty.com | provireni-fakty.com | | | |
| puesto-uruguayo24.com | puesto-uruguayo24.com | | | |
| qianjiangwanbao.com | qianjiangwanbao.com | | | |
| quotidiano-partenopeo.it | quotidiano-partenopeo.it | | | |
| quotidiano-polosud.it | quotidiano-polosud.it | | | |
| rassegnadivaldarno.it | rassegnadivaldarno.it | | | |
| renminribao.net | renminribao.net | | | |
| reporterdelpaese.it | reporterdelpaese.it | | | |
| responsnews.org | responsnews.org | | | |
| revelations-France.com | revelations-France.com | | | |
| ricerca-bari.net | ricerca-bari.net | | | |
| ricerca-ravenna.net | ricerca-ravenna.net | | | |
| ricerca-salerno.net | ricerca-salerno.net | | | |
| ricerca-terni.net | ricerca-terni.net | | | |
| ristorantedinotizie.it | ristorantedinotizie.it | | | |
| risultatidellalotteria.it | risultatidellalotteria.it | | | |
| rivadellenotizie.it | rivadellenotizie.it | | | |
| rodyne.com.ua | rodyne.com.ua | | | |
| romalibero.net | romalibero.net | | | |
| roomwithnews.tw | roomwithnews.tw | | | |
| rossiyskayagazeta.com | rossiyskayagazeta.com | | | |
| sabor-de-Mexico.mx | sabor-de-Mexico.mx | | | |
| salut-figaro.fr | salut-figaro.fr | | | |
| sanpetersburgotv.com | sanpetersburgotv.com | | | |
| saperetoday.it | saperetoday.it | | | |
| seaofnews.taipei | seaofnews.taipei | | | |
| semana-en-Colombia.co | semana-en-Colombia.co | | | |
| seminaire-dinformation.com | seminaire-dinformation.com | | | |
| seminaire-numerique.com | seminaire-numerique.com | | | |
| shanghaitimes.de | shanghaitimes.de | | | |
| shotyzhnya.com | shotyzhnya.com | | | |
| siracusainrepubblica.net | siracusainrepubblica.net | | | |
| skarbnytsya.com.ua | skarbnytsya.com.ua | | | |
| sobre-Portugal.com | sobre-Portugal.com | | | |
| sociedad24-7.cl | sociedad24-7.cl | | | |
| societe-en-mouvement.com | societe-en-mouvement.com | | | |
| societe-non-censuree.com | societe-non-censuree.com | | | |
| society24-7.Asia | society24-7.Asia | | | |
| sommaire-informatif.net | sommaire-informatif.net | | | |
| sonrisageek.com | sonrisageek.com | | | |
| south-africa24-7.net | south-africa24-7.net | | | |
| spazioregionale.com | spazioregionale.com | | | |
| sport-arena24.com.ua | sport-arena24.com.ua | | | |
| sport-vesti.com | sport-vesti.com | | | |
| sport-zhyttya.com | sport-zhyttya.com | | | |
| staffetadinovita.it | staffetadinovita.it | | | |
| staffetaitaliana.it | staffetaitaliana.it | | | |
| staffetaonline.it | staffetaonline.it | | | |
| stampa-tuttigiorni.com | stampa-tuttigiorni.com | | | |
| stellagiornaliera.com | stellagiornaliera.com | | | |
| sunrisnews.com | sunrisnews.com | | | |
| sunsenews.com | sunsenews.com | | | |
| svitove.com | svitove.com | | | |
| swimsuits-usa.us | swimsuits-usa.us | | | |
| swimsuitsus.com | swimsuitsus.com | | | |
| syogodni.com.ua | syogodni.com.ua | | | |
| tabasco-en-el-mundo.mx | tabasco-en-el-mundo.mx | | | |
| taccuinodiverita.it | taccuinodiverita.it | | | |
| tainanpost.com | tainanpost.com | | | |
| taipei-daily.org | taipei-daily.org | | | |
| taipei-news.com | taipei-news.com | | | |
| Taiwan-news24.Asia | Taiwan-news24.Asia | | | |
| Taiwan-statements.org | Taiwan-statements.org | | | |
| taiwantimes.net | taiwantimes.net | | | |
| taiwantv.xyz | taiwantv.xyz | | | |
| Tanzania-gazette.com | Tanzania-gazette.com | | | |
| taskoftday.com | taskoftday.com | | | |
| telegrammemaison.fr | telegrammemaison.fr | | | |
| textestraduits.com | textestraduits.com | | | |
| tgastrofchina.com | tgastrofchina.com | | | |
| tgoldenyear.com | tgoldenyear.com | | | |
| thartoftaiwan.tw | thartoftaiwan.tw | | | |
| the-American-media.us | the-American-media.us | | | |
| the-avant-garde.uk | the-avant-garde.uk | | | |
| the-central-london.uk | the-central-london.uk | | | |
| the-imperial-crown.uk | the-imperial-crown.uk | | | |
| the-local-info.us | the-local-info.us | | | |
| the-news-london365.uk | the-news-london365.uk | | | |
| the-post-kingdom.uk | the-post-kingdom.uk | | | |
| the-post-london.uk | the-post-london.uk | | | |
| the-postman.uk | the-postman.uk | | | |
| the-province.org | the-province.org | | | |
| the-province.us | the-province.us | | | |
| the-truth-birmingham.uk | the-truth-birmingham.uk | | | |
| the-voiceof-london.uk | the-voiceof-london.uk | | | |
| theartoftai.org | theartoftai.org | | | |
| thedailylife.Asia | thedailylife.Asia | | | |
| thelife.tw | thelife.tw | | | |
| theparistime.fr | theparistime.fr | | | |
| thepostaiwan.com | thepostaiwan.com | | | |
| thepostapp.com | thepostapp.com | | | |
| tiempo-chile.cl | tiempo-chile.cl | | | |
| tiempos-de-uy.net | tiempos-de-uy.net | | | |
| tiempos-nacionales24.com | tiempos-nacionales24.com | | | |
| tiempos-uruguayos.com | tiempos-uruguayos.com | | | |
| times-of-london365.uk | times-of-london365.uk | | | |
| tipodialberi.it | tipodialberi.it | | | |
| tmorrw.Asia | tmorrw.Asia | | | |
| todas-las-noticias.com | todas-las-noticias.com | | | |
| top-personnes.com | top-personnes.com | | | |
| torinolibero.net | torinolibero.net | | | |
| trapaniinrepubblica.net | trapaniinrepubblica.net | | | |
| trud-TV.com | trud-TV.com | | | |
| trustofpeople.com | trustofpeople.com | | | |
| tsenzor.com | tsenzor.com | | | |
| ttofchina.com | ttofchina.com | | | |
| tvij-den.com.ua | tvij-den.com.ua | | | |
| tvoe-zdorovya.com.ua | tvoe-zdorovya.com.ua | | | |
| tvusalive.com | tvusalive.com | | | |
| twofchange.com | twofchange.com | | | |
| tyzhnevyk.com | tyzhnevyk.com | | | |
| udn-Taiwan.com | udn-Taiwan.com | | | |
| uk-diarly24.uk | uk-diarly24.uk | | | |
| ukr-patriot.com | ukr-patriot.com | | | |
| ukrajinski-vidomosti.com.ua | ukrajinski-vidomosti.com.ua | | | |
| un-dia-en-Mexico.mx | un-dia-en-Mexico.mx | | | |
| united-london.uk | united-london.uk | | | |
| united-society365.uk | united-society365.uk | | | |
| univers-informatif.com | univers-informatif.com | | | |
| Uruguay-nacional.com | Uruguay-nacional.com | | | |
| uruguaya-365.net | uruguaya-365.net | | | |
| uryadovyj.com | uryadovyj.com | | | |
| usa-gazette.us | usa-gazette.us | | | |
| usapost2021.com | usapost2021.com | | | |
| uy-independiente.net | uy-independiente.net | | | |
| uy-noticias24-7.net | uy-noticias24-7.net | | | |
| uy-online24-7.net | uy-online24-7.net | | | |
| v-kraini.com | v-kraini.com | | | |
| vasha-neruhomist.com.ua | vasha-neruhomist.com.ua | | | |
| vedomosti-Russia.com | vedomosti-Russia.com | | | |
| verdad-espanola.es | verdad-espanola.es | | | |
| verdade-nacional.com | verdade-nacional.com | | | |
| verdade365.com | verdade365.com | | | |
| verita-italiana.it | verita-italiana.it | | | |
| verite-cachee.net | verite-cachee.net | | | |
| very-jokes.com | very-jokes.com | | | |
| vestipost.com | vestipost.com | | | |
| vettoreitaliano.com | vettoreitaliano.com | | | |
| viajar-a-Mexico.mx | viajar-a-Mexico.mx | | | |
| viajes-en-colombia24.co | viajes-en-colombia24.co | | | |
| vidomisti.com.ua | vidomisti.com.ua | | | |
| visages-France.net | visages-France.net | | | |
| vistnyk.com | vistnyk.com | | | |
| vistnyk.com.ua | vistnyk.com.ua | | | |
| vocedeltricolore.it | vocedeltricolore.it | | | |
| voice-city24-7.org | voice-city24-7.org | | | |
| voice-city24-7.us | voice-city24-7.us | | | |
| voice-of-Sudan.com | voice-of-Sudan.com | | | |
| voitureluxe2021.fr | voitureluxe2021.fr | | | |
| voix-France.fr | voix-France.fr | | | |
| vox-appennino.it | vox-appennino.it | | | |
| voz-ciudad.cl | voz-ciudad.cl | | | |
| voz-de-espana.es | voz-de-espana.es | | | |
| voz-de-Mexico.mx | voz-de-Mexico.mx | | | |
| voz-de-portugals.com | voz-de-portugals.com | | | |
| voz-del-pueblo-cl.cl | voz-del-pueblo-cl.cl | | | |
| vsinovyny24.com | vsinovyny24.com | | | |
| whatweather.today | whatweather.today | | | |
| wheeloffort.org | wheeloffort.org | | | |
| world-news-tw.org | world-news-tw.org | | | |
| worldachievem.com | worldachievem.com | | | |
| worldofspo.com | worldofspo.com | | | |
| xinkuaibao.net | xinkuaibao.net | | | |
| xinwen-tw.com | xinwen-tw.com | | | |
| yangzi-wanbao.com | yangzi-wanbao.com | | | |
| your-day.Asia | your-day.Asia | | | |
| za-pravdu.com | za-pravdu.com | | | |
| zakon-i-pravda.com.ua | zakon-i-pravda.com.ua | | | |

=== Gravitas Works ===
| Name | Domain | Status | Notes | Sources |
|---|---|---|---|---|
| Conservative Daily Post | ConservativeDailyPost.com | Defunct | Per PolitiFact. Repeatedly published false claims. Laura Hunter, the winner of Ms. World 2016, filed a lawsuit against the site owners in 2017 for the use of her name and image without her permission. | |
| Conservative Daily Review | conservativedailyreview.com | Defunct | Alternative name for the Conservative Daily Post. | |

=== Integrated Marketing Group Inc. ===
| Name | Domain | Status | Notes | Sources |
|---|---|---|---|---|
| The Federalist Papers | thefederalistpapers.org | | Not to be confused with The Federalist Papers from the 17th century or The Federalist website. Accused by the ADL of inciting violence against Barack Obama. Noted by PolitiFact to repeatedly publish false claims. Identified by the Center for Countering Digital Hate as a major distributor of climate change denialism, who also noted that the site shared COVID-19 misinformation and false information about elections in the United States. | |

=== Jackpot Bet Online ===
The following is a list of websites deemed by Bleeping Computer to be associated with Jackpot Bet Online, a betting company based in India.

| Name | Domain | Status | Notes | Sources |
|---|---|---|---|---|
| australiannewstoday.com | australiannewstoday.com | | | |
| bbcnewstoday.com | bbcnewstoday.com | | Impostor site of BBC News. | |
| bloombergnewstoday.com | bloombergnewstoday.com | | Impostor site of Bloomberg News. | |
| bostonnewstoday.com | bostonnewstoday.com | | | |
| britishnewstoday.com | britishnewstoday.com | | | |
| canadiannewstoday.com | canadiannewstoday.com | | | |
| chinaworldnewstoday.com | chinaworldnewstoday.com | | | |
| chroniclenewstoday.com | chroniclenewstoday.com | | | |
| cnbcnewstoday.com | cnbcnewstoday.com | | Impostor site of CNBC. | |
| cnnworldtoday.com | cnnworldtoday.com | | Impostor site of CNN. | |
| crunchbasenewstoday.com | crunchbasenewstoday.com | | Impostor site of Crunchbase. | |
| dailyexpressnewstoday.com | dailyexpressnewstoday.com | | | |
| dailyheraldnewstoday.com | dailyheraldnewstoday.com | | | |
| dailymirrornewstoday.com | dailymirrornewstoday.com | | | |
| dailystarnewstoday.com | dailystarnewstoday.com | | | |
| dailytelegraphnewstoday.com | dailytelegraphnewstoday.com | | Impostor site of the Daily Telegraph. | |
| dutchnewstoday.com | dutchnewstoday.com | | | |
| dwnewstoday.com | dwnewstoday.com | | | |
| europeannewstoday.com | europeannewstoday.com | | | |
| forbesnewstoday.com | forbesnewstoday.com | | Impostor site of Forbes. | |
| frenchnewstoday.com | frenchnewstoday.com | | | |
| germaynewstoday.com | germaynewstoday.com | | | |
| guardiannewstoday.com | guardiannewstoday.com | | Impostor site of The Guardian. | |
| headlinesworldnews.com | headlinesworldnews.com | | | |
| huffingtonposttoday.com | huffingtonposttoday.com | | Impostor site of the Huffington Post. | |
| irishnewstoday.com | irishnewstoday.com | | | |
| italiannewstoday.com | italiannewstoday.com | | | |
| livemintnewstoday.com | livemintnewstoday.com | | | |
| maltanewstime.com | maltanewstime.com | | | |
| mirrornewstoday.com | mirrornewstoday.com | | | |
| nationalposttoday.com | nationalposttoday.com | | | |
| neatherlandnewstoday.com | neatherlandnewstoday.com | | | |
| neweuropetoday.com | neweuropetoday.com | | | |
| norwaynewstoday.com | norwaynewstoday.com | | | |
| oxfordnewstoday.com | oxfordnewstoday.com | | | |
| portugalnewstoday.com | portugalnewstoday.com | | | |
| postgazettenewstoday.com | postgazettenewstoday.com | | | |
| republicofchinatoday.com | republicofchinatoday.com | | | |
| reuterstoday.com | reuterstoday.com | | Impostor site of Reuters. | |
| russiannewstoday.com | russiannewstoday.com | | | |
| scotlandnewstoday.com | scotlandnewstoday.com | | | |
| spanenewstoday.com | spanenewstoday.com | | | |
| switzerlandnewstoday.com | switzerlandnewstoday.com | | | |
| thedailymailnewstoday.com | thedailymailnewstoday.com | | Impostor site of the Daily Mail. | |
| thedailytelegraphnewstoday.com | thedailytelegraphnewstoday.com | | | |
| theexpressnewstoday.com | theexpressnewstoday.com | | | |
| theheraldnewstoday.com | theheraldnewstoday.com | | | |
| theindependentnewstoday.com | theindependentnewstoday.com | | | |
| theirishtimesnewstoday.com | theirishtimesnewstoday.com | | | |
| theirishtimestoday.com | theirishtimestoday.com | | | |
| themetronewstoday.com | themetronewstoday.com | | | |
| themirrornewstoday.com | themirrornewstoday.com | | | |
| thequintnewstoday.com | thequintnewstoday.com | | | |
| thestarnewstoday.com | thestarnewstoday.com | | | |
| thesunnewstoday.com | thesunnewstoday.com | | | |
| thetelegraphnewstoday.com | thetelegraphnewstoday.com | | | |
| timesofnetherland.com | timesofnetherland.com | | | |
| timesofspanish.com | timesofspanish.com | | | |
| topeuropenews.com | topeuropenews.com | | | |
| topworldnewstoday.com | topworldnewstoday.com | | | |
| turkeynewstoday.com | turkeynewstoday.com | | | |
| walesnewstoday.com | walesnewstoday.com | | | |
| washingtonposttoday.com | washingtonposttoday.com | | | |
| Washington Times News Today | washingtontimesnewstoday.com | | Impostor site of The Washington Times. | |

=== Regency Enterprises ===
The following is a list of sites created by Regency Enterprises to promote the movie A Cure for Wellness. Some of the false stories led to significant user engagement on social media and were debunked by fact-checkers.

| Name | Domain | Status | Notes | Sources |
|---|---|---|---|---|
| Houston Leader | houstonleader.com | | | |
| Indy Gazette | indygazette.com | | | |
| NY Morning Post | nymorningpost.com | | | |
| Sacramento Dispatch | sacramentodispatch.com | | | |
| Salt Lake City Guardian | saltlakecityguardian.com | | | |

=== Runway ===
The following is a list of websites created by Runway News Media Group, a public relations firm based in Canada. These sites have been described as pink slime.

| Name | Domain | Status | Notes | Sources |
|---|---|---|---|---|
| Glasgow Tribune | | | | |
| Leeds Tribune | | | | |
| London Economist | | | | |
| London Telegraph | | | Used a similar logo as The Telegraph and a synthesized advertisement from The New Yorker. Republished stories from RT without attribution, which was previously sanctioned by the United Kingdom. Several stories with claims without evidence or opinions were presented as news. | |
| Manchester Observer | | | | |

=== Salem Media Group ===
| Name | Domain | Status | Notes | Sources |
|---|---|---|---|---|
| PJ Media | pjmedia.com | Active | Spread misinformation about face masks with respect to COVID-19, vaccines, and climate change. Identified by the Center for Countering Digital Hate as a major distributor of climate change denialism. Accused by the Global Disinformation Index of spreading misogynistic disinformation and climate change denial disinformation. Described by NewsGuard as "[promoting] misleading and unfounded claims, including about the COVID-19 pandemic" and "not [distinguishing] between news and opinion". Falsely claimed a link between abortion and breast cancer. Falsely claimed that nearly all news stories about Donald Trump in 2018 on Google News were from left-wing outlets. Made false claim without evidence against a Muslim group in New York City. | |
| RedState | redstate.com | Active | Identified by the Center for Countering Digital Hate as a major distributor of climate change denialism. Accused by the Global Disinformation Index of spreading misogynistic disinformation. Falsely claimed that Facebook attempted to stop the campaign to recall Gavin Newsom for the 2021 California gubernatorial recall election. | |
| Townhall | townhall.com | Active | Identified by the Center for Countering Digital Hate as a major distributor of climate change denialism. Accused by the Global Disinformation Index of spreading anti-LGBTQ+ disinformation. Per the Daily Beast, Mike Adams would repeatedly post to the site to mock the LGBTQ community and students at University of North Carolina Wilmington who accused him of harassment. Spread Clinton body count conspiracy theory. | |
| Twitchy | twitchy.com | Active | Identified by the Center for Countering Digital Hate as a major distributor of climate change denialism. Accused by the Global Disinformation Index of spreading disinformation. | |

=== Tune Media ===
| Name | Domain | Status | Notes | Sources |
|---|---|---|---|---|
| Morning News USA | morningnewsusa.com | Defunct | Published false claim that associated children watching Peppa Pig with developing autism. The parent company, Tune Media, was founded and chaired by James Kong, who also founded the Australian edition of the International Business Times in 2006. A former writer for IBT Australia has also had his writings published on morningnewsusa.com. | |

=== Vivendi ===
| Name | Domain | Status | Notes | Sources |
|---|---|---|---|---|
| reportersansfrontieres.com | reportersansfrontieres.com | | Spoof of Reporters without Borders. | |
| reportersansfrontieres.fr | reportersansfrontieres.fr | | Spoof of Reporters without Borders. | |
| reporterssansfrontieres.com | reporterssansfrontieres.com | | Spoof of Reporters without Borders. | |
| reporterssansfrontieres.fr | reporterssansfrontieres.fr | | Spoof of Reporters without Borders. | |
| rsff.fr | rsff.fr | | Spoof of Reporters without Borders. | |
