= Future of Local News Act =

- Long title: To establish the Future of Local News Committee to examine and report on the role of local news gathering in sustaining democracy in the United States and the factors contributing to the demise of local journalism, and to propose policies and mechanisms that could reinvigorate local news to meet the critical information needs of the people of the United States in the 21st century.
- Announced in: the 117th United States Congress
- Number of co-sponsors: 5

Legislative history
- Introduced in the House as H.R.3169 by Ro Khanna (D–CA) on May 12, 2021; Committee consideration by United States House Committee on Energy and Commerce, United States House Committee on Small Business

The Future of Local News Act of 2021 (S. 1601) is a bill introduced into the United States Senate on May 13, 2021, by Brian Schatz (D-Hawai‘i), Michael Bennet (D-Colo.) and Amy Klobuchar (D-Minn.) with a companion bill (H.R. 3169) introduced into the United States House of Representatives by Marc Veasey (D-Texas). It was officially described as a reintroduction of the "Future of Local News Commission Act of 2020" (S.4772), which had been introduced September 30, 2020, by Schatz, Bennet, and Klobuchar; the primary (and perhaps only) difference between the 2020 and 2021 bills were changing the word "Commission" to "Committee" and deleting it from the title. This group would be required "to examine and report on the role of local news gathering in sustaining democracy in the United States and the factors contributing to the demise of local journalism, and to propose policies and mechanisms that could reinvigorate local news to meet the critical information needs of the people of the United States in the 21st century." The majority and minority leaders of both chambers of Congress, and the Chairs of the Corporation for Public Broadcasting and the National Endowment for Humanities would each select two members, and the chief executive officer of the United States Agency for Global Media would select a thirteenth member. This study group would have a budget of a million dollars to produce a report within a year of their first meeting.

== Media commentary ==
Maui Now and Inside Radio noted that this bill is designed to recommend responses to the problem of news deserts. News & Tech said that Senator Maria Cantwell (D-Wash.) supports offering "about $2.3 billion worth of tax credits and grants for local newspapers and broadcasters as part of President Biden's infrastructure plan".

The Poynter Institute said, "The bill has been endorsed by major journalism organizations including PEN America, the Society of Professional Journalists, Local Independent Online News Publishers and the NewsGuild."

== Legislative History ==
Congress	Short title	Bill number(s)	Date introduced	Sponsor(s)	# of cosponsors	Latest status
117th Congress	Future of Local News Act of 2021.	H.R.3169	May 12, 2021	Ro Khanna(D-CA)	5	Referred to Committees of Jurisdiction.
117th Congress	Future of Local News Act of 2021.	S.1601	May 12, 2021	Brian Schatz(D-HI)	2	Referred to Committees of Jurisdiction.
