= Upper Fillmore Revitalization Project =

Real estate development project

Coordinates: 37.7904°N 122.4344°W

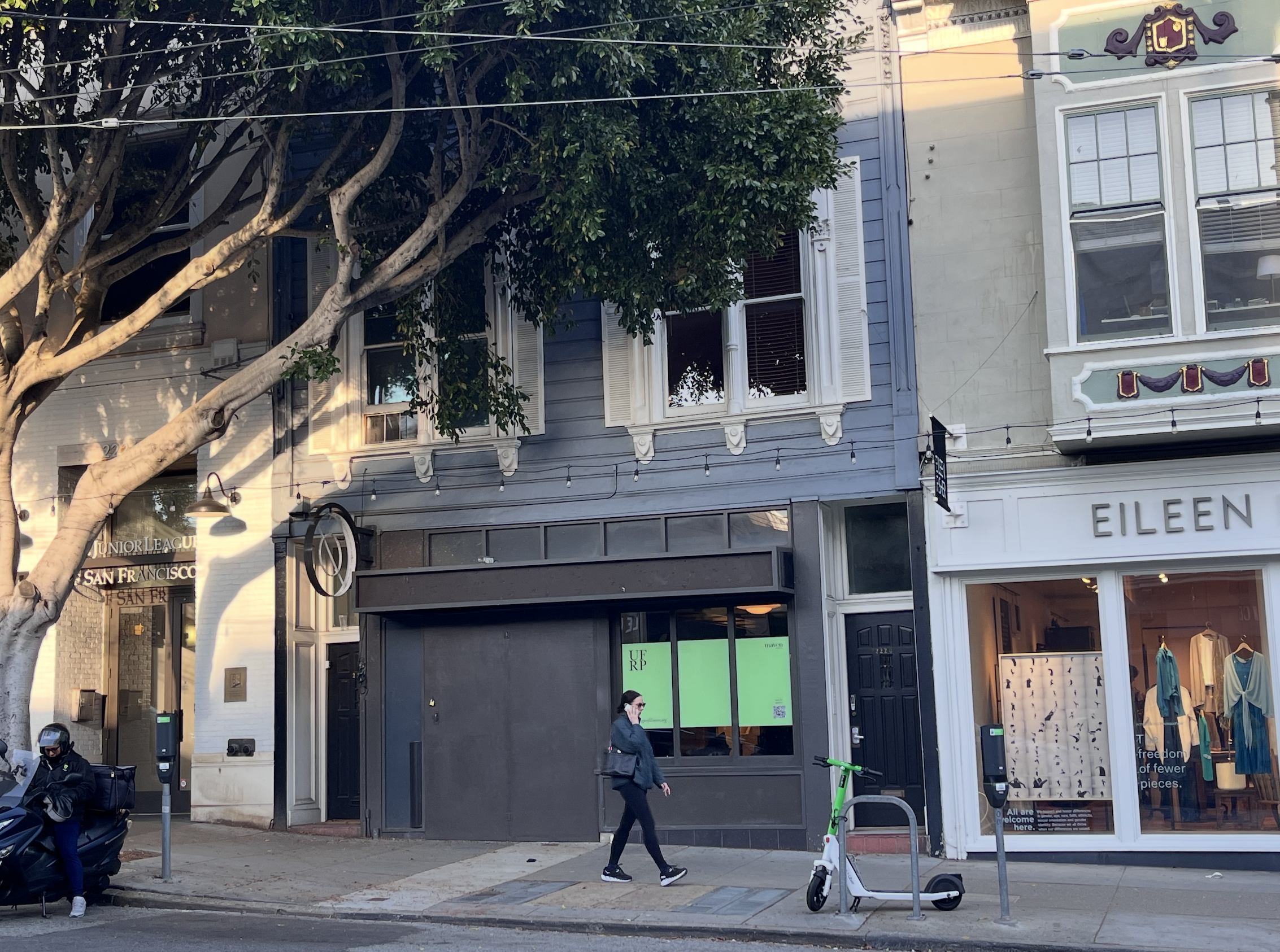
The former Starbucks location, now boarded up with a UFRP logo, at 2222 Fillmore Street in February 2025.

The Upper Fillmore Revitalization Project (UFRP) is a real estate development project in San Francisco, California, US. The project has led to controversy, pushback from local officials, and a new San Francisco City Ordinance.

== Ownership and acquisitions ==
The Upper Fillmore Revitalization Project, or UFRP, states that their goal is to restore and revitalize Upper Fillmore Street, in the Lower Pacific Heights and Pacific Heights neighborhood of San Francisco, California. The project is funded by venture capitalist Neil Mehta, and operated by nightlife entrepreneur Cody Allen. Both are residents of the neighborhood.

=== Funding ===
In August 2024 it was reported that Cody Allen raised $100 million for an investment fund — Aegis Reserve Partners LP — from a single investor. It was later revealed to be Mehta.

On September 30, 2024, Neil Mehta penned an op-ed in the San Francisco Standard stating that he donated his "entire interest to a nonprofit, I have zero financial interest in these properties and will receive nothing in return." The San Francisco Chronicle reported that Allen confirmed this in an interview. However, the Chronicle couldn't find evidence of the non-profit organization, and the Standard reported that "The organization has no website, and no record of it could be found with federal tax officials."

In April 2026 the Chronicle reported that Allen raised an additional $50 million for UFRP, this time via Friends of Fillmore LP. The Chronicle went on to reiterate that they have been unable to verify Mehta and Allen's repeated claims that UFRP is a nonprofit.

=== Buildings acquired ===
As of January, 2025, the UFRP has spent approximately $40 million to acquire the following buildings through LLCs it owns and controls.

Building	Sale Date	LLC Name	Purchase Price	Current/Former Tenant
2001 Fillmore	April 9, 2024	White Birches, LLC	$5.5 million	Noosh (shuttered)
2207-2211 Fillmore	April 3, 2024	Shaded Flame, LLC	$4.3 million	L'Occitaine (shuttered)
2208-2010 Fillmore	April 3, 2024	Pointed Blue, LLC	$9.7 million	La Mediterranee and Eileen Fisher (both current as of Feb 2025)
2213-2217 Fillmore	April 8, 2024	Temperate Lands, LLC	$5.6 million	Joe & The Juice (current as of Feb 2025)
2220-2222 Fillmore	April 15, 2024	North Room, LLC	$4.9 million	Starbucks (shuttered)
2235-2237 Fillmore	Unknown	Great Stage, LLC	Unknown	Ten-Ichi (shuttered)
2259-2261 Fillmore	January 12, 2024	Fillmore Reserve, LLC	$11 million	the Clay Theater and Alice + Olivia (both shuttered)

== Closures and neighborhood impacts ==
=== Ten-Ichi closure ===
In September 2024, Ten-Ichi, a family owned and operated Japanese restaurant on Fillmore Street since 1978 closed. Prior to the closure, ABC 7 reported that Steve Amano, the owner, felt they were "being strong-armed into closing".

=== Additional closures ===
In June 2024, Noosh, a Mediterranean restaurant, both of which was located in a building the UFRP purchased, shut down operations.

In December 2024, a Starbucks location that had been "open since the early 1990s" and Alice & Olivia, a high end boutique connected to the Clay Theater closed.

=== La Mediterranee ===
La Mediterranee, a restaurant with legacy business designation, and which has been in its current location since 1979, was told they would need to move out when their lease was up in May 2025 so that UFRP could conduct a seismic retrofit and then bring in a "high-end retail tenant." However, in December, 2024, it was reported that La Med, as it is referred to, was given a four-year lease extension.

=== Other impacts ===
In December 2024, the San Francisco Chronicle reported that at least one residential tenant has been affected by the UFRP acquisitions.

In January 2025 it was reported that the vacant storefronts owned by UFRP, including the historic Clay Theatre, were boarded up.

Additionally, Zero&, a boba tea shop at 2252 Fillmore, closed in January 2025. However, there is no evidence that UFRP owns the building where they were located.

== Development ==
In April 2026, UFRP received approval from the San Francisco Historic Preservation Commission for their plans to renovate the Clay Theater. Their renovation is expected to cost $5 million.

== Pushback and legislation ==
The building acquisitions and business closures have resulted in op-eds and letters to various local news outlets. One opinion piece in the San Francisco Examiner by a local bar owner and president of a small business association accused the UFRP of misleading the public about the true purpose of acquiring buildings on Fillmore Street. The opinion piece went on to question why the UFRP owned vacant storefronts, while declining to extend Ten-Ichi's lease.

Soon after the San Francisco Chronicle began to report on the UFRP, San Francisco Supervisor Aaron Peskin held a live press conference in front of La Med. In the August 26, 2024 press conference, he detailed a plan to protect Legacy Businesses, a designation given by the city, from eviction. He subsequently introduced and passed legislation requiring a public hearing before a Legacy Business can be evicted.

In response to increased scrutiny on the building acquisitions, UFRP hired public relations firm Singer Associates to represent them.

In April 2025, Neil Mehta gave an interview in which he stated that Aaron Peskin "had picket signs with my face on them, marching down the street, 'billionaire taking over city.'" In response, Peskin described Mehta's comments as "defamatory and untrue" and requested that Mehta issue a public retraction. Mehta declined to retract his comments, stating through his spokesperson Sam Singer, "We respect Mr. Peskin, but what was said on the record reflects the spirit of the situation. We do not intend to apologize or issue a retraction.”
