= Lower Pacific Heights, San Francisco =

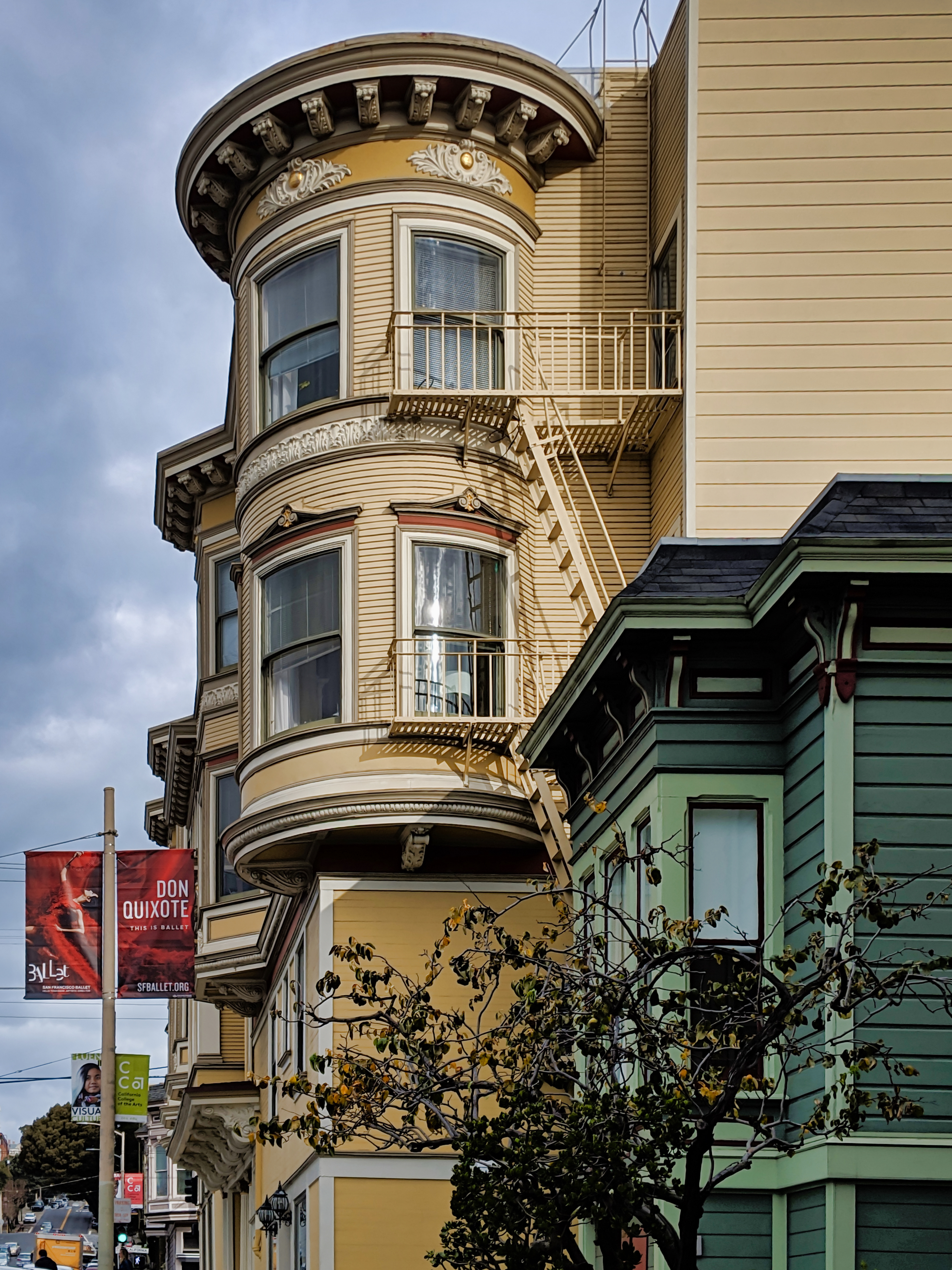
- Victorian home on Divisadero and California St.

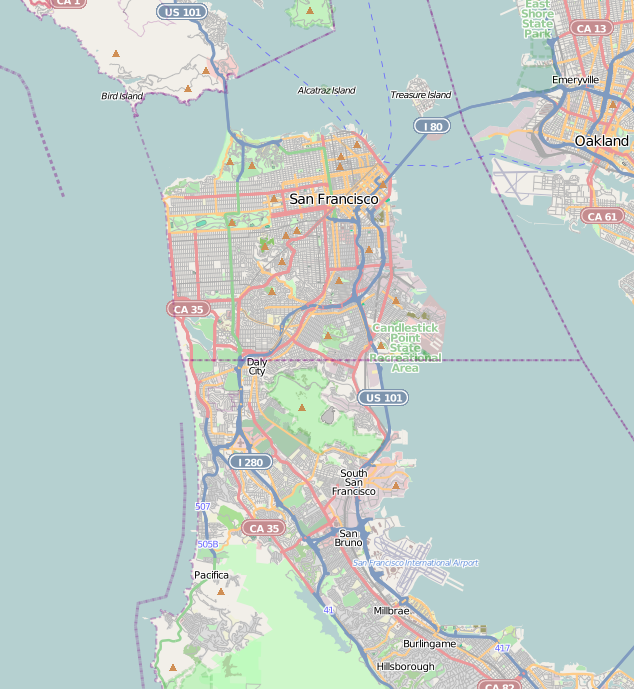
- Location within San Francisco
- Coordinates: 37.7870°N 122.4335°W
- Country: USA
- State: California
- City: San Francisco

Lower Pacific Heights, also known as Upper Fillmore, is a neighborhood in San Francisco, California, between Pacific Heights, the Fillmore District, Laurel Heights, and Japantown. The neighborhood is centered on the commercial corridor of Fillmore Street between California and Post streets, with California Street to the north, Geary Boulevard to the south, Presidio Avenue to the west, and Van Ness Avenue to the east.

== History ==
Historically, the area was part of the Western Addition. Long a middle-class neighborhood geographically and socially intermediate between Pacific Heights and the Lower Fillmore, the area became wealthier and more upscale with the escalation of San Francisco property values in the 1980s and 1990s, when the designation "Upper Fillmore" fell out of favor and "Lower Pacific Heights" came into increased use.

The neighborhood houses the Madame C.J. Walker Home for Girls and Women building (a San Francisco Designated Landmark), which from 1921 to 1972 it housed a charitable, community and social services organization for single African American woman new to San Francisco, who were not eligible to use the YWCA.

In 2024, venture capitalist Neil Mehta purchased a number of buildings on Fillmore Street, a shopping corridor, through a series of LLCs and began the Upper Fillmore Revitalization Project.
