= Moms 4 Housing =

U.S. housing activist group

Moms 4 Housing began as a housing activist group in Oakland, California, which later incorporated as a 501(c)(3) organization in 2020. It was formed and received national attention after three formerly homeless Black women moved their families into a vacant three-bedroom house as squatters without permission from the owner, a real estate redevelopment company. In January 2020, after resisting a judge's order to leave the residence, "the moms" were forcibly but peaceably arrested and removed by a heavily armed sheriff's department. A few days later, the governor and the mayor brokered a deal with Moms 4 Housing for a local community land trust to purchase what came to be called the "Moms' House" from the owner. After refurbishing the embattled house, the group began to use it as a transitional home for homeless mothers. The actions of Moms 4 Housing inspired California lawmakers to make changes to housing laws statewide.

== Occupation of the Moms' House ==
=== Background ===
In August 2019, Wedgewood Properties, a southern California real estate redevelopment firm, purchased the vacant three-bedroom house at 2928 Magnolia St in Oakland, California for $501,078 at a foreclosure auction. The company's business model is to buy, repair, and quickly flip homes, and NBC News reported that "Wedgewood rarely holds onto homes for long". The San Francisco Chronicle called Wedgewood "one of Oakland's most prolific house flippers".

Bloomberg calculated that to afford to rent a two-bedroom house in the same zip code in January 2020, a renter would need to be earning at least $86,920 per year. On average, Black women in the San Francisco Bay Area earn $49,369 and Latinas earn $39,600, making home ownership and even rental housing unaffordable.

=== Occupation and court battle ===
The occupation was a planned act of civil disobedience against house flipping and gentrification, not a spontaneous act of trespassing. Oakland City Councilmember Carroll Fife, at the time a community organizer, was "one of the masterminds" of the project. According to Fife, "I remember I said, Look, y'all, I don't have any homes. I don't have any networks of people who can rent to y'all. I don't have anything. But if you trust me at the end of this, you'll have a place to stay".

On November 18, 2019, Dominique Walker, a longtime community activist, and two other formerly homeless women entered the residence, later to be called "The Moms' House" as squatters. Walker, at the time, was the mother of a one-year-old and a four-year-old. The moms moved in their children, started to clean and to repair the property, brought in appliances, and began to pay the utility bills.

On December 30, 2019, Alameda County Superior Court Judge Patrick R. McKinney heard oral arguments regarding Wedgewood's legal action to evict the residents. Walker's attorneys argued that housing is a human right, and their clients' constitutional rights would be violated by an eviction.

On January 10, 2020, McKinney ordered Walker to vacate the property within five days, ruling that she had no valid rights of possession to the property and that while the social issues raised by Walker are important, they were outside the scope of the proceeding.

Attorney Leah Simon-Weisberg represented Walker and said she wasn't surprised by the ruling: "We understand that the court's hands are tied because in this country, property rights are valued over human rights."

Walker responded to the eviction order by saying, "We are here. And we're not leaving" and "Today is not a defeat. This is the beginning of a movement."

=== Eviction ===
After negotiations with the Alameda County Sheriff's Office failed to reach a compromise and the five days had elapsed, activists and supporters, about 50 people, assembled in front of the residence on Monday, January 13, 2020. By that evening the crowd had grown to number several hundred.

On January 14, 2020, just before 6am, sheriff's deputies wearing riot gear and camouflage, and armed with AR-15's arrived, along with armored vehicles, including a Bearcat. Some in the crowd taunted the deputies and some threw projectiles at them, according to Sergeant Ray Kelly of the sheriff's office. Using a battering ram against the front door, which deputies said had been barricaded, they entered the residence. The deputies arrested two of the moms and put their furniture out on the street. The two women, along with two men that were arrested for the same misdemeanor charges (resisting arrest and obstruction), were released that afternoon after posting $5,000 bail, raised by a GoFundMe campaign.

Kelly said "our personnel showed tremendous restraint" dealing with the situation which was "not your typical eviction", and was aware that "the whole world was watching". He said those taken into custody refused to cooperate and had asked to be peacefully arrested.

Walker was not arrested, nor present during the eviction as she and Carroll Fife were being interviewed for the news program Democracy Now! as the eviction was happening. The interview ended abruptly after Amy Goodman's question, "Carroll, we just hear that there was a text that says the sheriff is knocking on the door and saying people have to clear out. Is that your understanding, as we're speaking?".

Oakland mayor Libby Schaaf was "shocked" at the degree of force used, commenting, "These are mothers; they're not criminals. They're mothers that have engaged in what I believe is a courageous act of civil disobedience to really highlight our housing crisis".

Remaining permanently in the house was never the goal of the occupation, Walker told the New York Times, "The point was to bring even more awareness to a spiraling housing crisis that is on the verge of tearing the [San Francisco] Bay Area apart."

=== Reactions ===
Sam Singer, speaking on behalf of Wedgewood, defended the company's actions, saying, "As it does with all properties, Wedgewood planned to renovate and rehab it as soon as possible and put it back into the housing market, thereby improving the neighborhood, the community, and the city" adding that, "Wedgewood is sympathetic to the plight of the homeless and is a major contributor to shelter programs, inner-city youth, and the disadvantaged. The company hears what the individuals who were illegally squatting at the Magnolia Street home are saying—but it does not respect nor does it condone the theft of property."

California State Senator Nancy Skinner (D-Berkeley) said "It was totally legitimate for those homeless moms to take over that house".

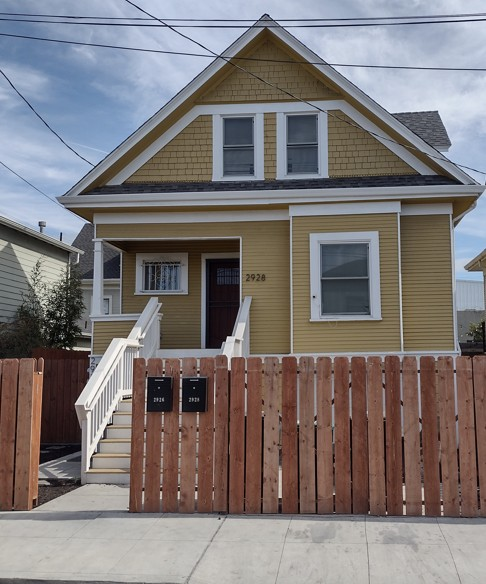
Moms' House in October 2023

=== Aftermath ===
On January 20, 2020, a joint press release from the Oakland mayor's office, Wedgewood, and Moms 4 Housing was issued, announcing a "good faith" agreement that the Oakland Community Land Trust would be purchasing the Moms' House for its appraised value. In addition, Wedgewood agreed to give community land trusts the right of first refusal on all the homes it currently owns in Oakland, and on any homes the company might later purchase. According to Vogue magazine, the sale of the house was part of a deal worked out by Schaaf and California Governor Gavin Newsom.

In May 2020, the trust completed the purchase of the embattled Magnolia Street house for $587,500 with donations raised from the group's supporters.

NBC Bay Area produced a four-part documentary about Moms 4 Housing's activism.

Moms 4 Housing inspired similar vacant home occupations in San Francisco, Los Angeles, Minneapolis, and Philadelphia.

Dominique Walker, co-founder of the moms' movement, was elected to the Berkeley Rent Stabilization Board in November 2020.

== Related legislation ==
On January 7, 2020, protesters from Moms 4 Housing interrupted a press conference when California State Senator Scott Weiner, alongside Schaff, Skinner, and other affordable housing proponents, was introducing Senate Bill 50, a piece of legislation that was intended to help address the problem. Some protesters reportedly yelled, "California hates the homeless", "No more market-rate apartments", and "Where's the affordable housing?".

In May 2020, Assemblyman Rob Bonta (D-Oakland) introduced the "Housing is a Human Right Act" to amend the California constitution, but it did not pass.

In September 2020, California Governor Gavin Newsom signed into law Senate Bill 1079, which had been introduced by Skinner. CBS News reported the legislation was inspired by Moms 4 Housing. The bill prohibits bundled foreclosure sales of residential properties to a single buyer at auction. And if a corporation submits the highest bid at auction, then local governments, non-profits, tenants, and individual buyers have a 45-day window to submit a higher (winning) bid for the property. Additionally, the law gives cities the authority to fine corporate owners as much as $5,000 per day for leaving a property "blighted" for longer than 30 days. Upon her bill becoming law, Skinner said in a statement: "SB 1079 sends a clear message to Wall Street: California homes are not yours to gobble up; we won't tolerate another corporate takeover of housing."

== Membership ==
Moms 4 Housing began as an ad hoc collective of homeless and marginally housed Oakland-born women. Two of its founding members, Dominque Walker and Misty Cross, were the moms who first moved in to the Magnolia Street house. Buzzfeed News reported in December 2019 that Tolani King and Jesse Turner were also members of the group.

Vogue magazine reported that Carroll Fife's husband, Tur-Ha Ak, provided security for the group and its supporters during the occupation and demonstrations outside.

In February 2022, the San Francisco Chronicle reported that while Fife had been the group's "lead organizer" during the occupation and protest, she is not running the organization, but that Dominique Walker and other moms are "at the helm".

== 501(c)3 organization and funding ==
In 2020, Moms 4 Housing established itself as a 501(c)3 organization. In 2023, it reported receiving $100,000 from the San Francisco Foundation.

Starting in 2023, the organization began to receive the majority of its funding from the San Francisco Foundation, another nonprofit with assets of $1.9 billion based in San Francisco. Also in 2023, the California attorney general announced Moms 4 Housing would received $50,000 from a 2021 settlement against Wedgewood Properties.

== Mission ==
As the group argued in court, Moms 4 Housing believes that housing is a human right, and that homes in the community should not remain vacant, owned by corporations, when there are people, especially children, who need housing. The group's "ultimate goal is to reclaim housing for the community from speculators and profiteers", according to its official website in June 2022.

After the sale of the property was completed, the group refurbished it, preparing it to be a transitional home for homeless mothers. Residents who live at Mom's House agree to pay one-third of their income as rent, and can stay for up to two years as they rebuild their credit. During their stay they receive "wraparound" services which include counseling and financial planning. Bry'ana Wallace, along with her 1-year-old son, were the first tenants of Mom's House in December 2021.

As of February 2022, the group was working with Rising Sun Center for Opportunity, an Oakland nonprofit that offers job training programs for women in the construction and building trades, to find suitable tenants. Although only five residents can be housed at Mom's House, the group hopes to acquire additional properties in the future, and to hire the women to help renovate them.
