= Clay Theatre =

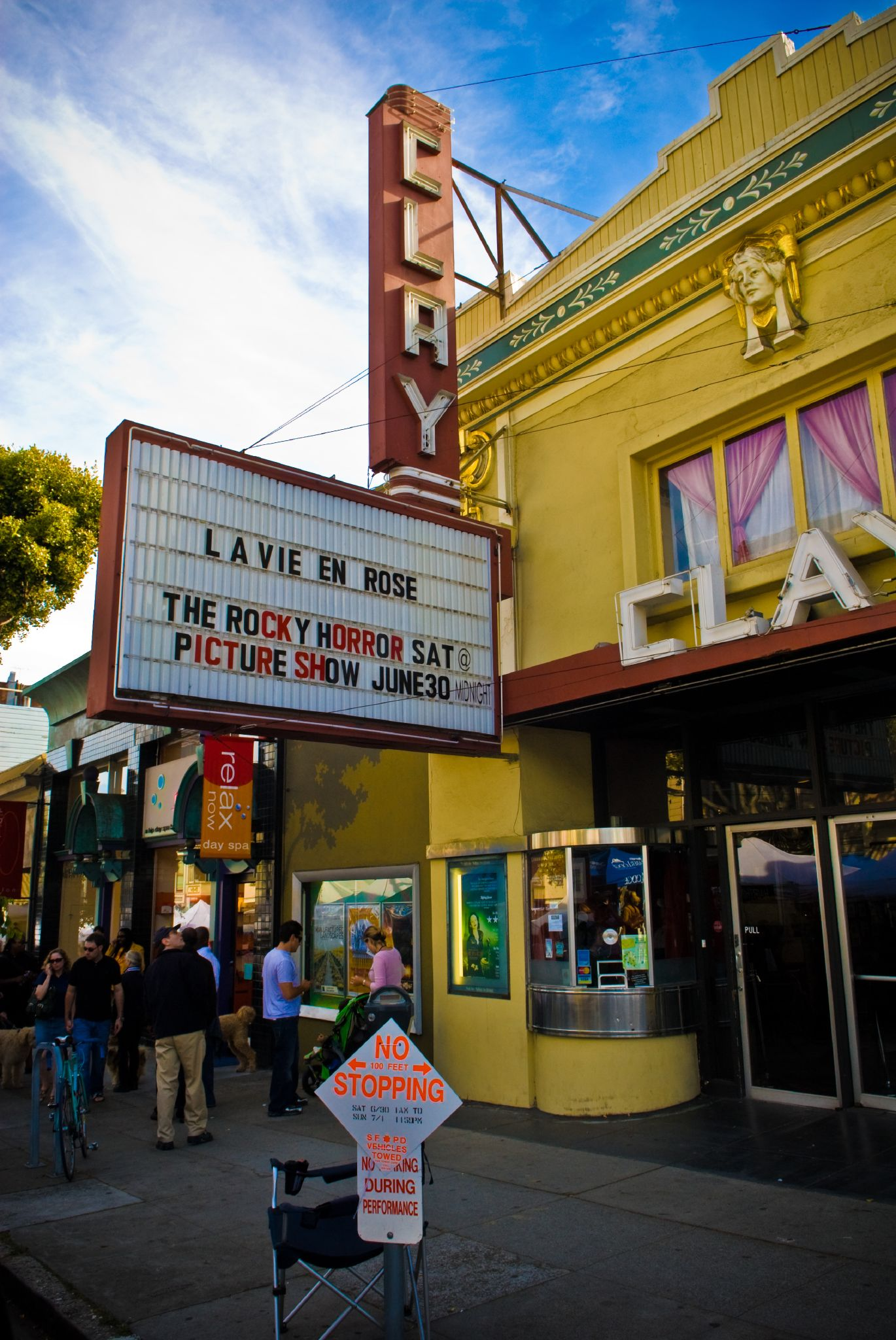
- Clay Theatre in 2007

- Location within San Francisco County Location within California
- 37.7905°N 122.4344°W
- Location: 2261 Fillmore Street, San Francisco, California, United States

History
- Built: c. 1913 – c. 1914

San Francisco Designated Landmark
- Designated: May 6, 2022
- Reference no.: 302

Clay Theatre is a historic 1913 single screen theater building in the Pacific Heights neighborhood of San Francisco, California, United States. It was formerly known as The Regent, The Avalon, The Clay International, and Landmark's Clay Theatre. It has been listed as a San Francisco Designated Landmark since May 6, 2022.

== History ==
It was founded in c. 1913 – c. 1914, as The Regent, a nickelodeon-style small movie theater often showing Mary Pickford films. It later became The Avalon in 1931.

In 1935, it opened as The Clay International under the leadership of Herbert Rosener, and was focused on showing foreign films. It was the first theater in the city dedicated to foreign film. The Song to Her (1934), and Goodbye, Beautiful Days (1935) were shown here in 1935.

In the 1950s, the building exterior was greatly modified, including moving of the ticketing booth and a change to the shape of the entrance (formerly an archway).

In modern-day, the single screen theater held 325 seats. Filmmaker John Waters had remembered early showings of Pink Flamingos (1972) at the Clay Theatre. It was also known for midnight showings of The Rocky Horror Picture Show (1975), after the film release and a decade after. The Clay was part of a chain of indie theaters across the United States owned by Landmark Theatres starting in 1991 (and sometimes called Landmark's Clay Theatre).

== Closure ==
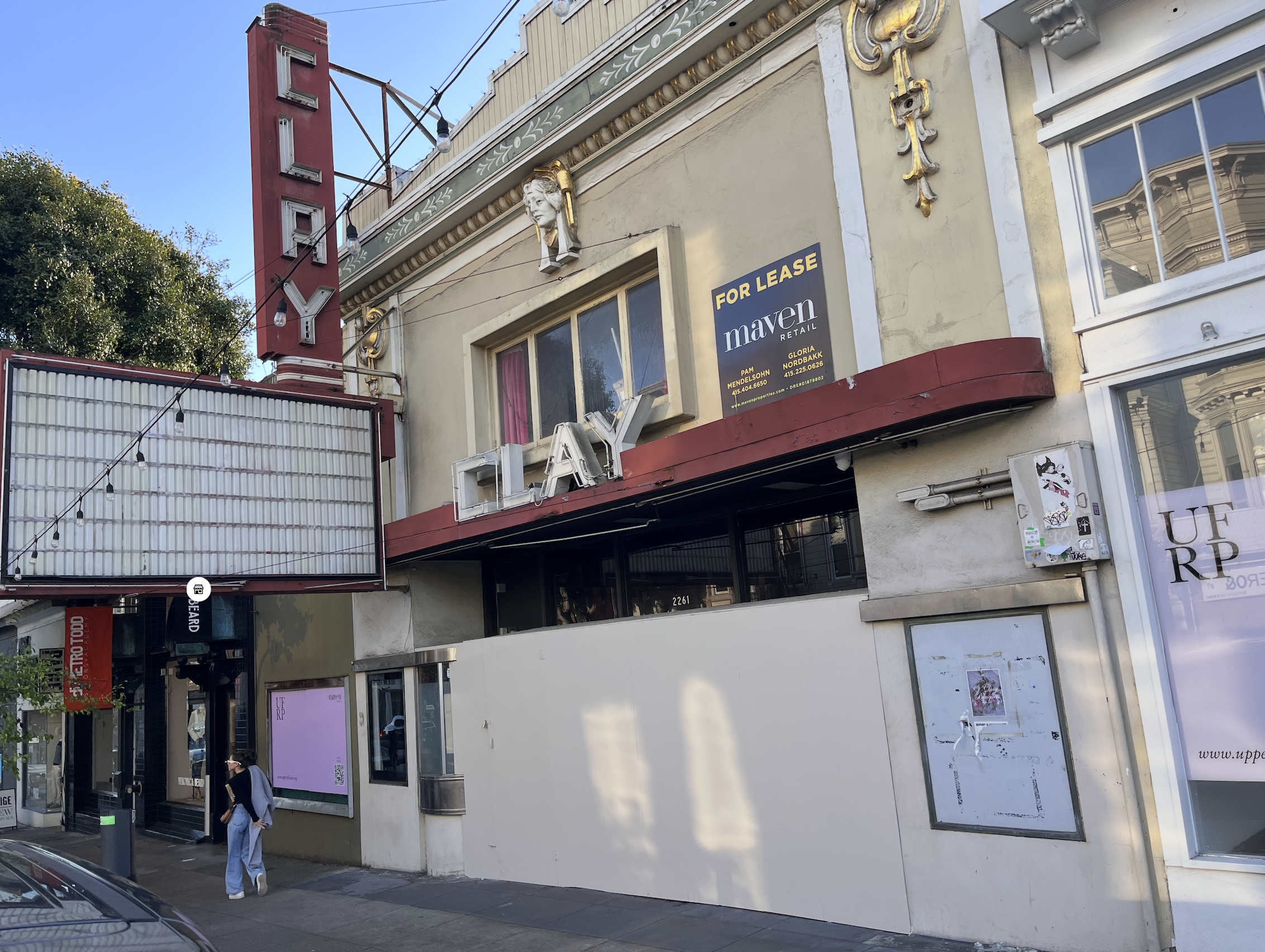
The vacant and boarded up Clay Theatre in February 2025

In late January 2020, shortly before the COVID-19 pandemic, the Clay Theatre was closed by Landmark Theatres. In 2021, the owner removed the seating from the theater and filed an application to convert it to retail use.

The local community rallied in hopes of the building re-opening as a movie theater, and in May 2022 it was designated a city landmark.

In February 2024, the theatre and the adjacent building, which then housed the store Alice + Olivia, were purchased by investment trusts linked to Neil Mehta. In June 2025, Mehta's Upper Fillmore Revitalization Project announced plans to reopen the Clay Theatre as a 200-seat repertory cinema after nenovations to upgrade its facilities and improve fire safety and ADA compliance. Ted Gerike, the founder of Now Instant Image Hall, a cinema and bookstore in Los Angeles, was hired as creative director of the theater.

== See also ==
- List of San Francisco Designated Landmarks
