= Carroll Fife =

Community activist and politician

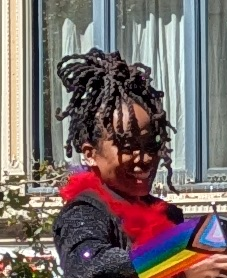
Carroll Fife in 2024

Carroll Fife is an American community activist and politician. She has served as the city councilperson for the 3rd district of Oakland, California since January 2021.

== Early life and education ==
Fife was born to an African-American family in Michigan. As a teenager, Fife, the middle of three children, worked in Muskegon Heights, Michigan. She told Mother Jones that her grandfather was one of the first Black city councilmen in Muskegon.

After becoming a parent, she settled in Pasadena, California and then moved to Oakland in 1999 to create a small private school which closed four years later.

Fife has a degree in psychology from Holy Names University, a private school she attended as an adult. She worked as a paralegal before working for the community-based Alliance of Californians for Community Empowerment (ACCE). In 2017 she was named the interim director of the Oakland/San Francisco chapter of ACCE.

== Housing activism ==
Fife received national attention in 2019 for helping Moms 4 Housing, a group of Black mothers who occupied a vacant corporate-owned West Oakland home, advocating that housing should be recognized as a basic human right.

In a 2022 interview, Fife told SFGate that homelessness in Oakland was directly due to "neo-liberal policies" and "race-blind policies" created by the "overproduction of market rate units and rapid speculation". In June 2022, the council unanimously approved Fife's plan to create a rent registry to make rental property ownership and historical rental price information available to the public.

== City councilmember ==
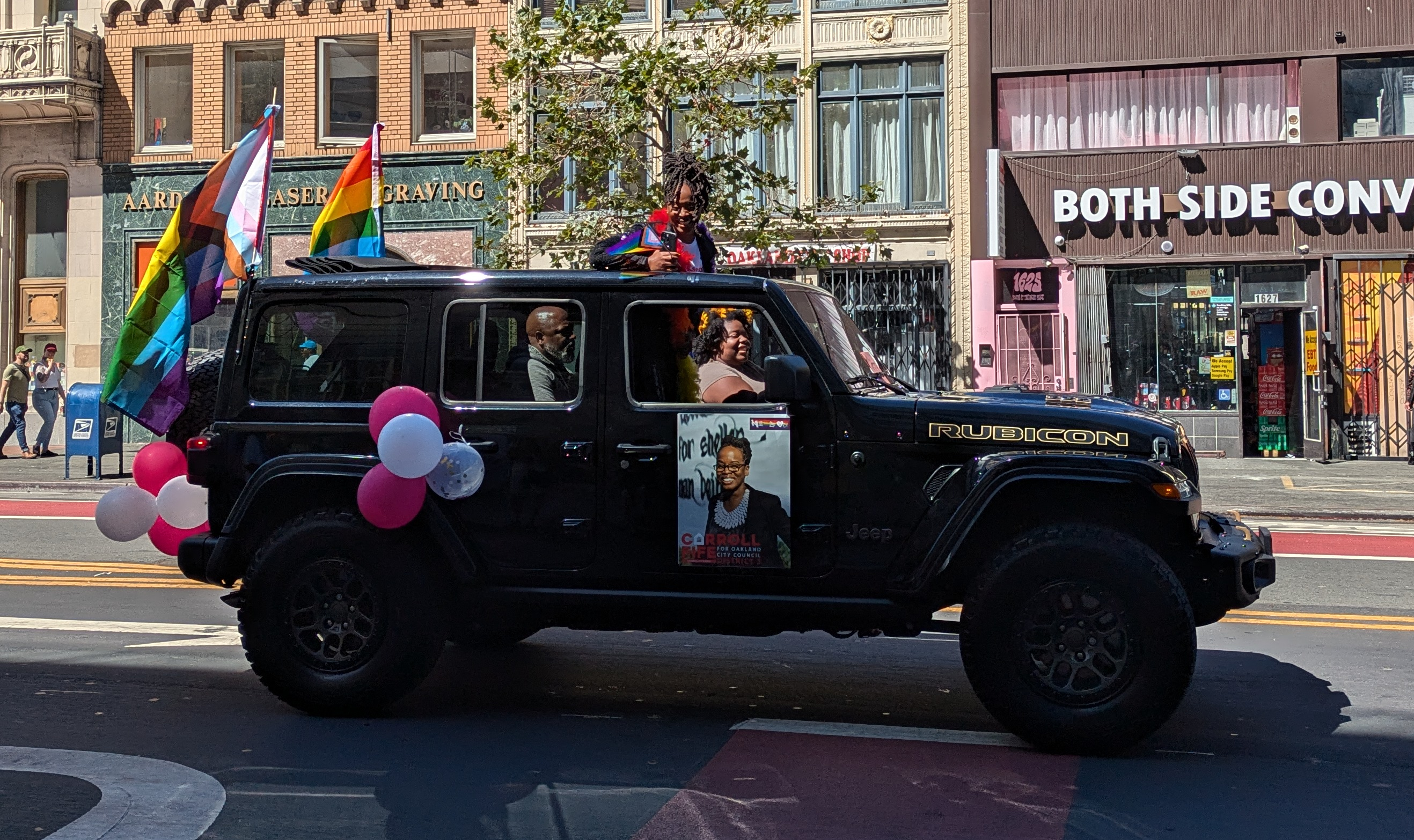
Fife (top center) at the 2024 Oakland Pride Parade

Fife won her 2020 election to the Oakland City Council, defeating the two-term incumbent by nearly 20 percentage points. In 2021, she advocated for a controversial measure to shift $17.4 million in funding from the Oakland Police Department to the Department of Violence Prevention, to "employ violence interrupters and community ambassadors in flatland neighborhoods". Oakland mayor Libby Shaaf criticized the council's 7-2 vote approving the budget change, saying the loss of funding to the police would mean losing 50 officers in the city.

On Martin Luther King Jr. Day, in January 2023, Fife, a Black woman, publicized the violent and racist threats she had received against her and other public officials. Fife told KQED news, "The only reason I posted it is because it’s gotten worse lately. Because this has been happening to me, honestly, pretty consistently since Moms 4 Housing".

During a February 2023 homeless camp closure, an altercation between Fife, her longtime partner, and Vincent Williams, the founder of the Urban Compassion Project, broke out when Williams loudly accused Fife of trying to derail the relocation of the residents. The incident ended when her partner pushed Williams to the ground. Fife told KRON-TV that he interceded after Williams lunged at her, but Williams said he was the one attacked. A battery charge was filed against Fife's partner in January 2024, and was later dismissed.

In November 2023, the Associated Press reported that Fife's resolution to call for a ceasefire in the Gaza war passed the Oakland City Council 8–0.
