= Neil Mehta =

American venture capitalist

- Born: San Francisco, California, U.S.
- Education: Harker School; London School of Economics
- Occupations: Entrepreneur; businessperson; investor
- Organization: Greenoaks

Neil Mehta is an American venture capitalist and the founder and managing partner of Greenoaks Capital, a venture capital investment firm that makes long-term investments in technology companies. Mehta's investments have included Coupang, Wiz, Deliveroo, Robinhood, Scale AI, and Toast.

== Early life and education ==
Mehta grew up in Atherton, California and attended the Harker School in San Jose, California. When he graduated from high school in 2002, he was part of Harker's first high school class.

He graduated from the London School of Economics with a degree in government and economics, and founded an investment club focused on private equity.

== Career ==
After graduating, Mehta invested in private businesses with Kayne Anderson Advisors. He went on to join the hedge fund D.E. Shaw in Hong Kong, where he worked on special situations investments in Asian real estate and technology.

=== Greenoaks ===
Mehta founded Greenoaks with his friend Benny Peretz, naming the firm after the street he grew up on in Atherton, California.

Mehta invested in the Korean eCommerce company Coupang, where he remains on the board. He also invested in the Indian hotel group Oyo Rooms, Rippling, and Wiz.

Bloomberg reported that Mehta warned his portfolio companies about the risks at Silicon Valley Bank in November 2022, five months before the bank collapsed in March 2023. Business Insider reported that, because of the warning, around 12 of the companies withdrew an approximate, combined, $1 billion from the troubled bank prior to its collapse.

Mehta invested in Carvana despite skepticism from limited partners; as of March 2025 the investment has increased and is valued at approximately $1.2 billion.

=== Personal ===
In 2024, Mehta purchased seven properties on Fillmore Street in Upper Fillmore, including the Clay Theatre, through a series of LLCs. He later said that the properties were purchased to revitalize the area.

Mehta is a fan of Batman, and named one of his funds Carmine, "after the mob boss and frequent Batman enemy."

== Philanthropy ==
In 2022, Mehta created The Mehta Endowment in Support of Scholarships and Entrepreneurship at his alma mater, the Harker School, with a $5 million donation and up to $5 million more in matching funds.

== Awards and recognitions ==
- Forbes 30 under 30 — 2014
- Ranked 9th on the Forbes Midas List in 2022. Appeared on the list every subsequent year.

== Personal life ==
Mehta lives in the Pacific Heights neighborhood of San Francisco, California, with his wife Jasheen.
