= Michael Amick =

American soccer player

Personal information
- Full name: Robert Michael Amick
- Date of birth: April 3, 1995 (age 31)
- Place of birth: Sunnyvale, California, United States
- Height: 1.84 m (6 ft 0 in)
- Position: Defender

Youth career
- 2009–2013: De Anza Force

College career
Years	Team	Apps	(Gls)
2013–2016	UCLA Bruins	73	(1)

Senior career*
Years	Team	Apps	(Gls)
2014	OC Pateadores Blues	3	(0)
2016	FC Golden State Force	5	(0)
2017	Portland Timbers 2	13	(0)

International career
2012	United States U18		
2014	United States U20		
- * Club domestic league appearances and goals as of 15:08, 21 October 2017 (UTC)

Robert Michael Amick (born April 3, 1995) is an American former soccer player.

== Career ==
=== Amateur & College ===
Amick attended high school at The Harker School where he earned two varsity letters in soccer. He was ranked as the number 18 club player in the country by Top Drawer Soccer. He was also ranked number 15 on College Soccer News list of Top 150 Recruits for 2013.

Amick spent four years playing college soccer at the University of California, Los Angeles between 2013 and 2016, where he appeared in 73 games for the Bruins, tallying 1 goal and captaining the team for three years.

Amick also appeared for USL PDL sides OC Pateadores Blues and FC Golden State Force.

=== Professional ===
After being drafted by the Portland Timbers with the overall 32nd pick (2nd Round: 10th pick), he debuted for the Timbers 2 against the Tulsa Roughnecks in the USL. He started 11 games and made 15 appearances during his rookie season.
