= Harker School =

Private k-12 school in San Jose, California, United States

The Harker School

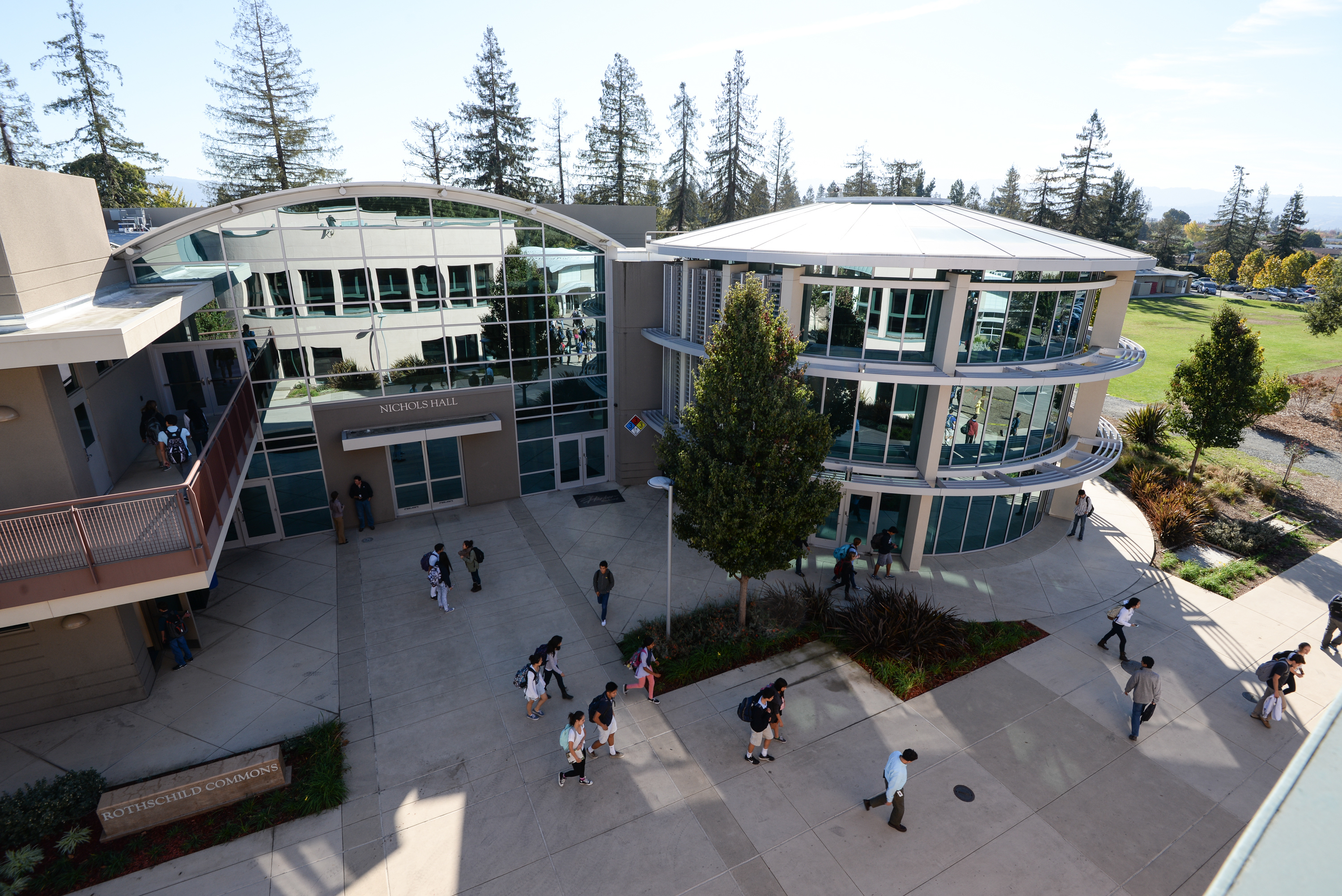
- Nichols Hall

Location
- Upper School: 500 Saratoga Avenue; Middle School: 4525 Union Avenue; Lower School: 4300 Bucknall Road; San Jose, California; United States; 37.3176°N 121.9715°W

Information
- Former names: Manzanita Hall (1893–1919), Miss Harker's School (1902–1972), Palo Alto Military Academy (1919–1972), Harker Academy (1972–1993)
- Type: Independent
- Motto: K through Life
- Established: 1893, as Manzanita Hall
- Head of school: Brian Yager
- Faculty: 450
- Grades: PreK–12
- Gender: Coeducational
- Colors: Green and White
- Athletics conference: West Bay Athletic League
- Mascot: Eagle
- Endowment: $301 million in total assets (2022)
- Tuition: Upper School: $66,950; Middle School: $61,450; Lower School: $51,550; Transitional Kindergarten (Pre-K): $46,350; *All tuition options are non-boarding
- National Merit Semifinalists: 52 (2021)
- Website: www.harker.org

The Harker School is a private, co-educational school located in San Jose, California. Founded in 1893 as Manzanita Hall, Harker has three campuses: Bucknall, Union, and Saratoga, named after the streets on which they lie.

== Overview ==
The Bucknall campus houses the Lower School (kindergarten through grade 5), the Union campus houses the Middle School (grades 6–8), and the Saratoga campus houses the Upper School (grades 9 through 12).

Harker School's tuition is higher than comparable private schools in the Bay Area. Many of the 35+ after-school programs have historically been included in the tuition. As of 2026, annual tuition for the Lower School is $51,550, compared to $61,450 for the Middle School, and $66,950 for the Upper School. The San Francisco Chronicle noted that tuition at the most expensive private schools in the Bay Area, including Harker, exceeds "two of California’s top private colleges, Stanford University and Santa Clara University," and "far exceed undergraduate tuition rates for public colleges."

=== Upper school ===
The upper school, offering grades 9 through 12, is located on the Saratoga Avenue campus. The campus was previously home to an all-girls school, Mother Butler Memorial High School, which merged with Archbishop Mitty High School in 1969. The upper school was added to the K–8 program in 1998, with the first class of graduates in 2002.

=== Middle school ===
The middle school is located on the Union campus, the former site of the Harker Preschool. Since the opening of the upper school in 1998, most students choose to remain at Harker School after middle school.

=== Lower school ===
The elementary school is located on the Bucknall campus, the former site of Bucknall Elementary School. The campus was purchased by Harker School in 1997. The lower school also has an after-school orchestra, as well as sports and other activities.

== History ==
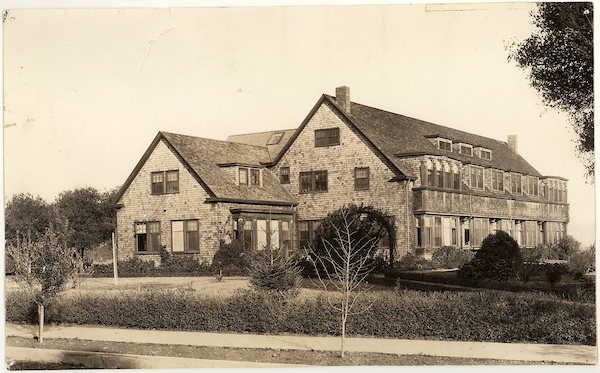
Miss Harker's School (c. 1915) in Palo Alto, California

The Harker School was founded as three distinct schools, which merged in 1972 to form Harker Academy and in 1993, The Harker School.

=== Manzanita Hall and Palo Alto Military Academy ===
In 1891, Stanford University founding president David Starr Jordan influenced Frank Cramer to open the Palo Alto Preparatory School for Boys. The school was renamed Manzanita Hall in 1892, and by September 1894 the school enrolled 24 students. In 1893, the school was a boys day school and boarding school. The Manzanita Hall school began at 1129 Parkinson Avenue in Palo Alto, California. In 1915, the enrollment was 60 boys. in 1919, Manzanita Hall was purchased and renamed Palo Alto Military Academy, which remained until 1972.

=== Miss Harker's School ===
In 1902, Miss Harker's School was founded by Catherine Harker as a girls day school, with a limited boarding school, also located in Palo Alto. In 1917, the enrollment was 40 girls and it served as a preparatory school for competitive colleges such as Stanford University. From 1902 to 1907, Miss Harker's School was located at 1121 Bryant Street in Palo Alto; and moved to 1050 Greenwood Avenue in Palo Alto, where the campus expanded and the nearby streets were renamed (Melville and Harker Street) to reflect the campus.

=== Harker Academy ===
In 1972, the Palo Alto Military Academy and Miss Harker's School merged to form the Harker Academy. With the merger, the school moved to 500 Saratoga Avenue in San Jose, California. in 1993, its name changed to The Harker School.

In 1954, the Harker School joined the California Association of Independent Schools (CAIS) and the Western Association of Schools and Colleges.

== Academics ==
=== Academic Olympiad competitions ===
Harker students won gold medals at the International Physics Olympiad (IPHO) in 2004, 2009, 2014, and 2022. In 2016, Harker students won one gold and two silver medals at the U.S. Physics Olympiad. At the International Linguistics Olympiad, Harker students won silver medals in 2009 and 2022 and a gold medal in 2012. In 2016, a Harker student won the gold medal at the International Informatics Olympiad. In 2022, a team of 4 Harker students representing the U.S. team won the gold medal at the International Economics Olympiad. In the International Mathematical Olympiad, Harker students won silver medals in 2006 and 2020. Beyond medal winners, Harker School has sent numerous students to represent the U.S. team at International Olympiads.

=== Science research competitions ===
In the Siemens Competition, Harker School had four national semi-finalists in both 2006 and 2007, and six in 2008. In 2012, Harker had four regional finalists and six semi-finalists: one-fourth of the regional finalists in California were from The Harker School.

In the Intel Science Talent Search, a Harker student won the $75,000 second place award in 2006. From 2007 to 2009, 12 Harker School seniors were named national semi-finalists, the largest number of any school west of the Mississippi in those years. In 2010, Harker School had one Intel finalist. In 2011, Harker School had seven semi-finalists and was the only school with two Intel finalists. In 2012, Harker School had 11 Intel semi-finalists, the most in California and second in the nation behind Stuyvesant High School in New York. In 2013, Harker School again had six Intel semi-finalists, the most in California for the second year in a row, and one finalist. In 2014 Intel STS Harker had 10 semi-finalists, most of any school in California and one finalist. In 2015 Intel STS Harker had a record 15 semi-finalists, most of any school in the US and three finalists, again most of any school in USA with a student winning the first prize of $150,000. In 2016 Intel STS Harker had four semi-finalists and one finalist.

In 2017 Regeneron Science Talent Search, Harker had nine semi-finalists, tied as most of any school in USA with two other schools and had three finalists most of any school alone in USA. In 2018 Regeneron STS, Harker had six semi-finalists, tied as most of any school in California and two finalists. In the 2019 Regeneron STS, Harker had seven semi-finalists, the most of any school in California and three finalists, tied with another school as the most of any school in USA. In 2020, Harker had two semi-finalists and one finalist. In 2021, Harker had four semi-finalists. In 2022, Harker had six semi-finalists, most of any school in California. In 2023, Harker had six semi-finalists and one finalist.

=== Standardized testing ===
In 2014, Harker had the highest average SAT/ACT scores out of any high school in California, and the second highest average scores out of any high school in the nation.

Each year, several Harker students receive perfect scores (no wrong questions) on AP (Advanced Placement) exams. In 2013, 10 Harker students received perfect scores, more than 10 percent of the total worldwide that year. In 2019, 13 Harker students received perfect scores.

== Extracurricular programs ==
=== Athletics ===
Harker School offers an athletics program which includes football, volleyball, soccer, track and field, basketball, baseball, tennis, golf, softball, lacrosse, cross country running, swimming, water polo, wrestling, cheerleading, yoga, fitness, physical education, and dance. Students are encouraged to participate in sports from 4th grade onwards. In August 2017, Harker finished construction on their new athletic center on the upper school campus.

=== Performing arts ===
The Harker School offers a K–12 performing arts program. The upper school program offers courses in vocal and instrumental ensembles, acting, dance, and technical theater, as well as a program named the Certificate Program. In February 2018, Harker opened a new performing arts building on the Saratoga campus, which includes a 463-seat theater, dressing rooms and practice rooms, and a Bosendorfer 214VC CS grand piano.

=== Publications ===
Harker has student-run journalistic publications: newspaper (Winged Post), yearbook (Talon), news website (Harker Aquila, formerly talonwp.com), and news magazine (Wingspan), as well as a social media presence. Harker also has a science research magazine, Harker Horizon, which has an online presence and printed its inaugural issue in 2017. In addition, Harker began an economics magazine, Equilibrium, in 2019, and will maintain both an online presence and print its inaugural version in summer 2020. The school's art and literature magazine (HELM), has published 17 print issues as of late 2017.

== Issues ==
As with many schools in the Bay Area, finding housing for teachers has been challenging due to the ongoing housing crisis in the area. As such, in 2022, the school purchased two apartment buildings to convert to faculty housing for $3.8 million. The effect was the displacement of up to eight families who lived in the apartments. The school was said to provide some aide to assist with moving costs for those families, though the amount was not specified.

In August 2023, a 9-year-old girl, who had been participating in a summer program at Harker School was found unresponsive in the elementary school pool. Lifeguards and school nurses attempted lifesaving procedures, however the girl died. Camp was cancelled for the rest of the week, and the school provided mental health services to campers, students, and staff.

== Notable alumni and faculty ==
- Michael Amick, former professional soccer player
- Priscilla Chan (former faculty in 2007 to 2008), philanthropist and pediatrician; wife of Mark Zuckerberg
- Andy Fang (class of 2010), billionaire co-founder and CTO of DoorDash
- Maverick McNealy (class of 2013), number one ranked golfer in the World Amateur Golf Ranking; son of Scott McNealy
- Andrea Nott, Olympic synchronized swimmer
- John B. Owens, judge of the United States Court of Appeals for the Ninth Circuit
- Robert Rothbart (born Boris Kajmaković in 1986), Bosnian–Israeli–Serbian professional basketball player playing center for Ironi Nahariya in Israel
- Alexander Wang, fashion designer and former creative director of Balenciaga; named one of Time's "100 Most Influential People" in the artists category in 2015
- Matt Wolf, documentary filmmaker; director and producer of Teenage
- Varun Sivaram, American physicist and political advisor on clean energy technology and climate change policy; former CTO of ReNew Power
- Neil Mehta (class of 2002), venture capitalist; founder and managing partner Greenoaks Capital Management
- Joelle Anderson, professional football player for Bay FC.
