= Singer Associates =

Public affairs firm in San Francisco, California

- Formation: 2000
- Headquarters: San Francisco, California
- President: Sam Singer
- CFO: Sharon Rollins Singer
- Managing Partner: Adam A. Alberti
- Website: https://singersf.com

Singer Associates is a public affairs firm in San Francisco, California. Founded by Sam Singer in 2000, the firm specializes in crisis communications. Its clients have included energy companies such as ChevronTexaco and Calpine, as well as the San Francisco 49ers and the San Francisco Ballet.

== History ==
The firm was founded by Sam Singer in 2000, after the sale of Kamer-Singer Associates to GCI Group in 1999.

In 2022, the House Oversight Committee invited five PR firms, including Singer Associates, to testify on the role public relations firms have played in disseminating misinformation and disinformation about climate change on behalf of oil and gas companies. The firm did not show up to the hearing. The committee published a report titled "The Role of Public Relations Firms in Preventing Action on Climate Change".

Singer Associates donated $2,500 to the campaign to recall (now former) Oakland Mayor Sheng Thao.

== Notable clients ==
=== Chevron ===
Singer Associates operates the Richmond Standard, a website owned by Chevron that says they cover news about Richmond, California, where Chevron owns and operates an oil refinery. The website began operations in 2014, shortly after a fire at the refinery that "led roughly 15,000 local residents in a low-income community to seek medical treatment".

Permian Proud, which began operations in August 2022, is owned by Chevron and operated by Singer Associates. The site features stories from New Mexico and West Texas, "where Chevron has substantial drilling interests" and which are "home to the nation's highest-producing oil fields".

Singer Associates began working with Chevron in Ecuador in 2008 amid ongoing litigation from environmental organizations. Singer Associates runs The Amazon Post, a site similar to the Richmond Standard, but focused on Chevron's interests in Ecuador. The site began operations in 2009.

=== San Francisco Zoo tiger attack ===
Singer Associates was hired by the San Francisco Zoological Society in the aftermath of an incident wherein a Siberian tiger mauled a teenage boy to death. The subsequent investigation revealed that the tiger's enclosure wall was four feet shorter than recommended. In response, Singer Associates "urged the zoo to put up signs warning future visitors not to tease the animals" to prompt journalists to ask if the victim had been taunting the tiger prior to his death.

=== Others ===
==== Wedgewood Properties ====
Wedgewood Properties is real estate redevelopment firm based in southern California that owned the house at issue in the 2019 Moms 4 Housing incident.

==== Safe Embarcadero For All ====
Safe Embarcadero For All is a non-profit that was formed in 2019, and represented homeowners on San Francisco's embarcadero that wanted to stop a homeless shelter from being built nearby. The group hired Singer Associates.

Singer has also been hired by:

- Facebook
- Oakland Police Union
- Jack in the Box
- The San Francisco 49ers
- The San Francisco Bar Pilots Association after a ship crashed in 2009
- Former California Secretary of State Kevin Shelley
- The Transbay Joint Powers Authority
- Alex Tourk, Gavin Newsom's former campaign manager, after it was revealed Newsom had an affair with Tourk's wife
- Tetra Tech after "Whistleblowers came forward with accusations that Tetra Tech falsified reports," while contracted to clean up the radioactive waste at the Hunters Point Shipyard
- Lennar
- Don Fisher, the founder of Gap Inc.
- Upper Fillmore Revitalization Project
- Sapporo USA
- Oakland NAACP
- Ron Conway
- Garry Tan, after he tweeted that some SF supervisors should "Die slow" in 2024
- Tartine, after the workers began a campaign to form a union

== Reception ==
Mother Jones reported that "Journalists have described Singer as 'the master of disaster' and 'one of the most influential behind-the-scenes shapers of public opinion in the Bay Area'". The San Francisco Chronicle described Singer "as one of the – if not the – premier mouthpieces and spin doctors for companies doing business in San Francisco".

== See also ==
- The Richmond Standard
- San Francisco Zoo tiger attacks
- Edelman
- American Fuel and Petrochemical Manufacturers (AFPM)
