= The Richmond Standard =

News website

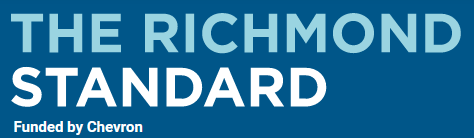
- Website type: News website
- Available in: English
- Headquarters: Richmond, California
- Owners: Chevron Corporation, Operated by Singer Associates
- Editor: Mike Aldax
- Website: richmondstandard.com
- Launched: 2014

The Richmond Standard is a corporate owned site for Richmond, California. The site describes itself as a news outlet, but is considered pink-slime journalism. Opened in 2014, It is funded by the Chevron Corporation, which owns the Chevron Richmond Refinery. The site has been criticized for its lack of coverage of stories that are negative toward Chevron.

== Overview ==
The Chevron Corporation has framed its funding of The Richmond Standard as community investment because The Independent, a Richmond-focused paper founded in 1910, had been folded into The Berkeley Gazette in 1978, only for the combined newspaper to shut down in 1984, leaving the area without local reporting.

=== Publisher ===
The site is operated by the public relations firm Singer Associates. Its three-person news team consists of editor Mike Aldax, a former San Francisco Examiner journalist; community and lifestyle reporter Zach Chouteau; and business reporter Mike Kinney.

== Ethics and neutrality ==
In September 2022, the United States House Committee on Natural Resources' report The Role of Public Relations Firms in Preventing Action on Climate Change found that The Richmond Standard had been created to quell public backlash in the wake of the Chevron Richmond Refinery's 2012 fire that resulted in approximately 15,000 residents seeking treatment at local hospitals and 19 occupational injuries.

In 2024, David Folkenflik of NPR and Miranda Green of Floodlight criticized the site for failing to report on a February 2021 pipeline rupture and November 2023 refinery flare that had polluted the air and water of the San Francisco Bay Area. They argued that Chevron's funding had biased its editorial stance against informing local residents of the health risks posed by this pollution. SFGate summarized their reporting, pointing out that "the Richmond Standard routinely underreports oil spills, as well as the refinery’s flares, which researchers have shown cause significant health risks."

Edward Wasserman, the former dean of the UC Berkeley Graduate School of Journalism, has likened the site's corporate funding to media ownership structures during the Gilded Age, claiming that it is unethical for Chevron to control public opinion in a town where it is the largest employer.
