= News desert =

Community with lesser news coverage

A news desert is a community that is no longer covered by daily or nondaily newspapers. The term emerged in the United States after hundreds of daily and weekly newspapers were closed in the 2000s and the 2010s. According to a study in 2018 by the UNC School of Media and Journalism, more than 1,300 communities in the U.S. are considered news deserts. Other communities, while not technically news deserts, may be covered by a ghost newspaper, a publication that has become a shadow of its former self.

In 2024, the Medill School of Journalism at Northwestern University released a report that found that 1,561 counties in the United States had only one local news organization (e.g. print newspaper, news website, public broadcaster, or ethnic media outlet) while 206 counties had none, that 55 million Americans lived in news desert counties, and that news desert counties had smaller populations, were less densely populated, had lower median household incomes, lower rates of educational attainment, a higher median population age, and higher poverty rates.

== Background ==
The term "news desert" was used as early as 1980 to explain the general character of newspaper coverage and accessibility in Canada at the beginning of the 20th century and its effect on the population's sourcing of local news. This initial context contrasts with the term's use in the 21st century, which primarily applies it as a frame for deficits or reductions in news coverage.

The total number of newspapers in the U.S. fell from 8,891 in 2004 to 7,112 in 2018, a decline of 1,779 newspapers, including more than 60 daily newspapers. Of the remaining publications, an estimated 1,000 to 1,500 newspapers were considered ghost newspapers after scaling back their news coverage so much that they were unable to fully cover their communities.

== Extent ==
In 2017, the Columbia Journalism Review released a map of news deserts across the United States. It showed that Collin County and Williamson County in Texas, with a combined population of nearly 1.3 million people, were among the largest news deserts in the country. Other notable news deserts include Ellis County, Texas and Alamance County, North Carolina. Some of those communities, however, may be covered by very small newspapers with a circulation of less than 1% or all-digital news outlets.

A study in 2018 by the UNC School of Media and Journalism found more than 1,300 news deserts in the United States. Of the 3,143 counties in the U.S., more than 2,000 no longer had a daily newspaper and 171 counties, with 3.2 million residents combined, had no newspaper at all. People who live in news deserts tend to be poorer, older and less educated than the average American, according to the study. As of 2018, more than 90 counties without a newspaper were in the Southern United States, making it by far the largest news desert in the country.

Medill's 2025 State of Local News report found that the number of U.S. counties with no local news source rose to 212, while 1,525 counties had only one remaining local news source, usually a weekly newspaper. Taken together, these counties were home to nearly 50 million people with limited or no local news access. The report also found that public broadcasting had become an important fallback in many areas, while digital-only outlets remained concentrated in more urban and affluent counties than the places most vulnerable to becoming news deserts.

== Impacts ==
In their 2024 report, the researchers at the Medill School of Journalism found that the decline in local news in the United States has contributed to increased political polarization, reduced voter turnout and split-ticket voting, and increased incumbency advantage due to national news becoming the only news that residents of news desert communities receive and lead them to vote more in accordance with a party line.

== See also ==
- Decline of newspapers
- Food Desert
