= James Cardinal Gibbons Memorial Statue =

Statue in Washington, D.C., U.S.

- The James Cardinal Gibbons Memorial Statue
- U.S. National Register of Historic Places
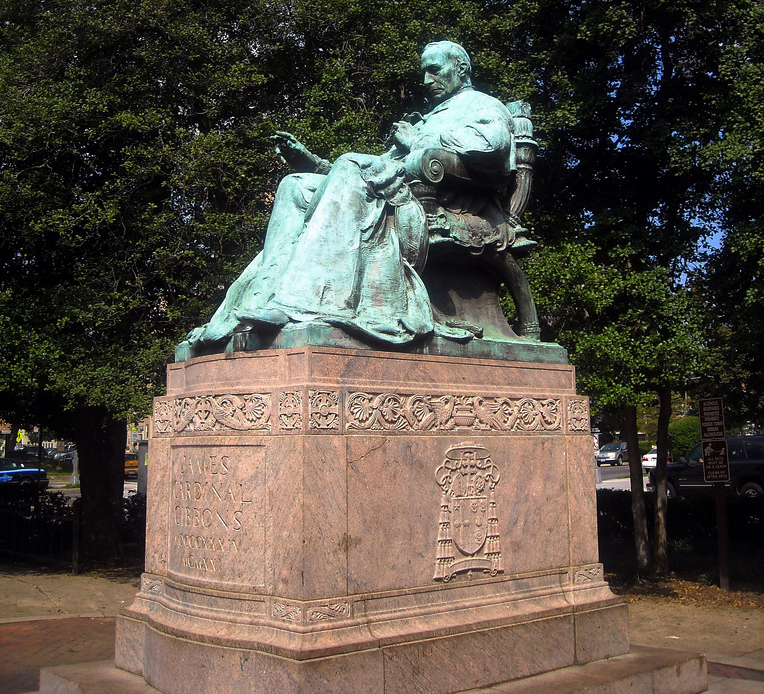
- Statue in 2008

- Location within Washington, D.C.
- Location: Reservation 309-G, 16th St. & Park Rd.NW., Washington, District of Columbia
- Coordinates: 38°55′53″N 77°2′10.31″W
- Area: less than one acre
- Built: 1932
- Architect: Leo Lentelli
- MPS: Memorials in Washington, D.C.
- NRHP reference No.: 07001051
- Added to NRHP: October 11, 2007

The James Cardinal Gibbons Memorial Statue is a public artwork by Leo Lentelli, located at the Shrine of the Sacred Heart, 16th Street and Park Road Northwest, Washington, D.C., United States.

The James Cardinal Gibbons Memorial Statue was originally surveyed as part of the Smithsonian's Save Outdoor Sculpture! survey in 1993. It was listed with the National Register of Historic Places in 2007.

== Description ==
It is a bronze figure of James Gibbons seated, wearing cardinal's robes. In his proper left hand he holds a cross which hangs from his neck. His proper right hand is raised as if giving a blessing. The base, which is made of granite and stands at a height of 8 ft. and width of 10 ft., and weighs 2,500 pounds, has a relief of a shield topped with an ecclesiastical hat called a galero. The shield has the coat of arms of the Roman Catholic Archdiocese of Baltimore on the left, joined with the Cardinal's personal coat of arms on the right. Around the shield are rows of tassels that represent the ranks of clergy. In this case, 15 rows indicate Gibbons' rank as Cardinal.

The front of the base displays:

JAMES
CARDINAL
GIBBONS
MDCCCXXXIV
MCMXXI

The rear of the base displays:

ERECTED BY
THE KNIGHTS
OF COLUMBUS
MCMXXXII

On the left side of the base is the artist's name and the founder's mark:

LEO LENTELLI Sc.
1932 ROMAN BRONZE WORKS N.Y.

== Acquisition ==
The James Cardinal Gibbons Memorial Statue was authorized by Congress and President Calvin Coolidge on April 23, 1928. The piece was commissioned by the Knights of Columbus and cost, at no expense to the United States, $35,998. The piece was unveiled on August 14, 1932. John F. Connelly attended the dedication ceremony.

== Information ==
The sculpture was installed to coincide with the Knights of Columbus' 50th anniversary. They chose to dedicate a sculpture on behalf of Gibbons because of his "preeminence as a great American." The sculpture was created in Lentelli's New York studio.

On February 22, 2007, the Gibbons Memorial was declared a Washington, D.C., historic site. On October 11, 2007, it was added to the National Register of Historic Places.
