= Jacqueline Mates-Muchin =

American rabbi

Religious life
- Religion: Judaism
- Ordination: 2002

Jacqueline Mates-Muchin is an American rabbi, and the first rabbi of Chinese-American descent.

== Life ==
Mates-Muchin is from San Francisco. Her mother was second-generation Chinese-American and her father was the son of Austrian Jewish immigrants who had survived the Holocaust. She was ordained by Hebrew Union College-Jewish Institute of Religion in New York in 2002. After serving as an assistant rabbi in Buffalo, New York, she joined Temple Sinai in Oakland, California in 2005. She was chosen as the first female senior rabbi of Temple Sinai in January 2015.

She is married with four children. She has received numerous awards for her academics and service.

== See also ==
- Timeline of women rabbis
