= El Capitan Theatre and Hotel, San Francisco =

1928 building in San Francisco, California, US

El Capitan Theatre and Hotel
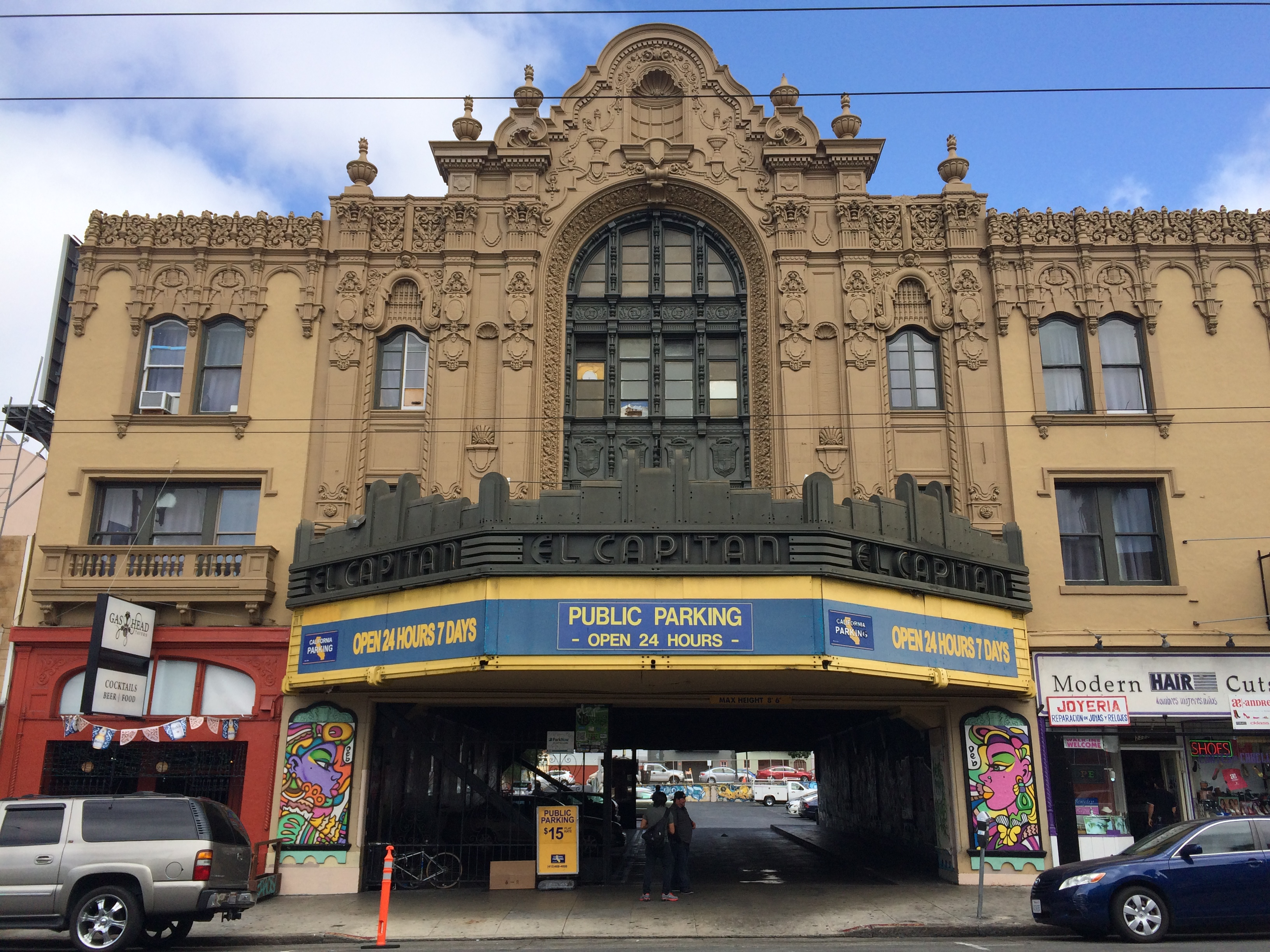
- El Capitan Theatre and Hotel in 2015

- Location within San Francisco County Location within California
- 37.759436°N 122.419117°W
- Location: 2353 Mission Street, San Francisco, California, U.S.

History
- Built: 1928; 98 years ago

San Francisco Designated Landmark
- Designated: March 3, 1996
- Reference no.: 214

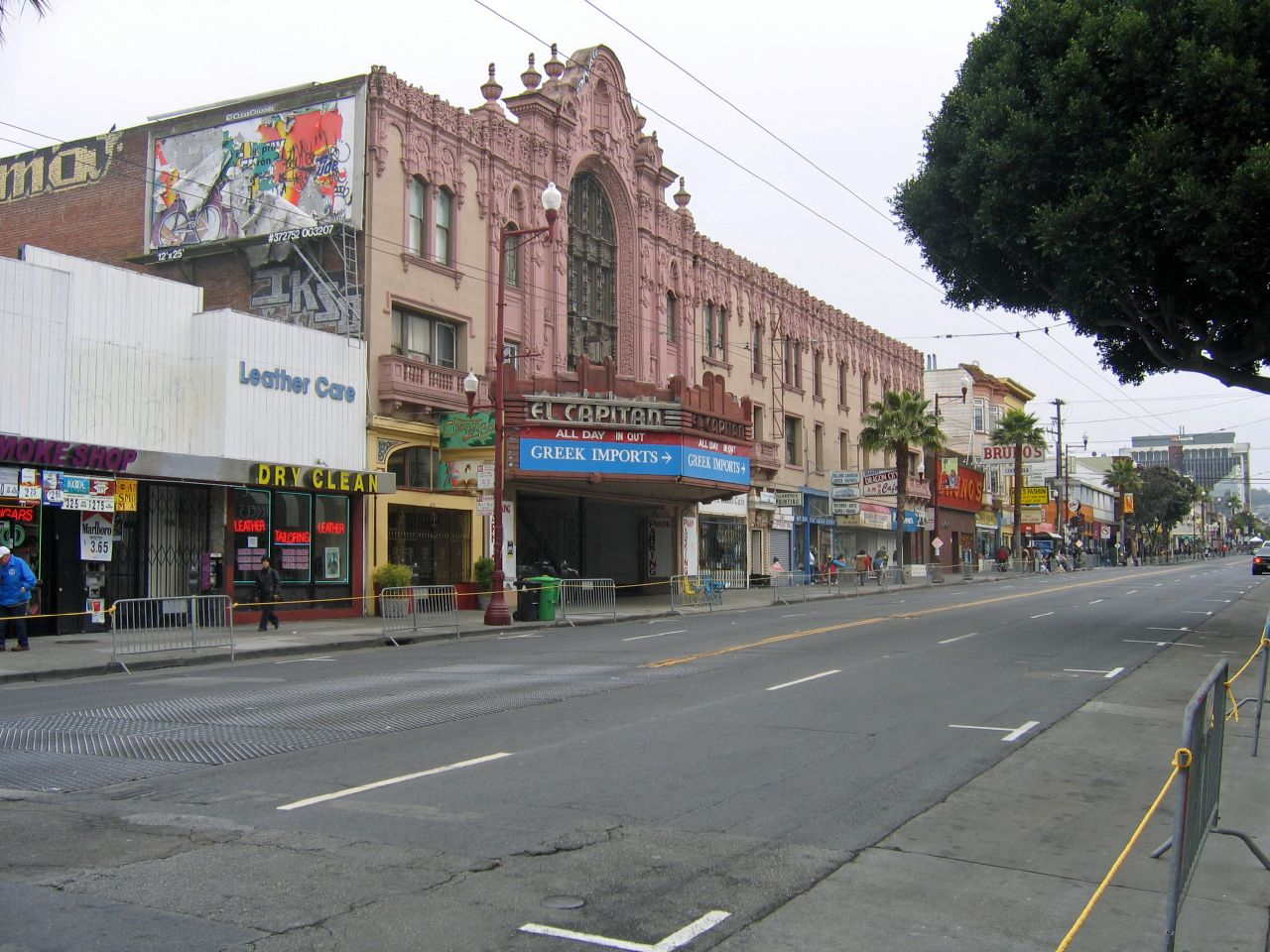
El Capitan Theatre and Hotel in 2007

El Capitan Theatre and Hotel, or The Cap, is a historic 1928 building containing a hotel, shops, and a former luxury vaudeville and movie theater in the Mission District of San Francisco, California. It has been listed by the city as a San Francisco Designated Landmark (no. 214), since March 3, 1996.

== History ==
It is a Spanish colonial revival style with a Mexican baroque façade, designed by architect Gustave Albert Lansburgh. When it was built for the Ackerman and Harris vaudeville circuit, it was the second largest theater in San Francisco with 3,100-seats. It opened on June 29, 1928, with Edward Sloman's silent film We Americans (1928) starring George Sidney, Patsy Ruth Miller, and George J. Lewis. The theater contained a Wurlitzer theatre organ (style 235) to accompany silent films.

The building later became part of Fox West Coast Theatres (now Fox Theatres) as the "Mission Street Showcase" theater, and by 1950, they introduced CinemaScope and stereophonic sound. It closed on December 15, 1957.

== Closure and modern history ==
In 1961, the theatre portion of the building was demolished, and turned into a parking lot by 1965. In 1994, the remaining portion of the building experienced a fire, which did not affect the façade. Still remaining are the hotel, the stores, the marquee, and the façade.

== See also ==
- List of San Francisco Designated Landmarks
