= Mission Branch Library =

Branch of the San Francisco Public Library

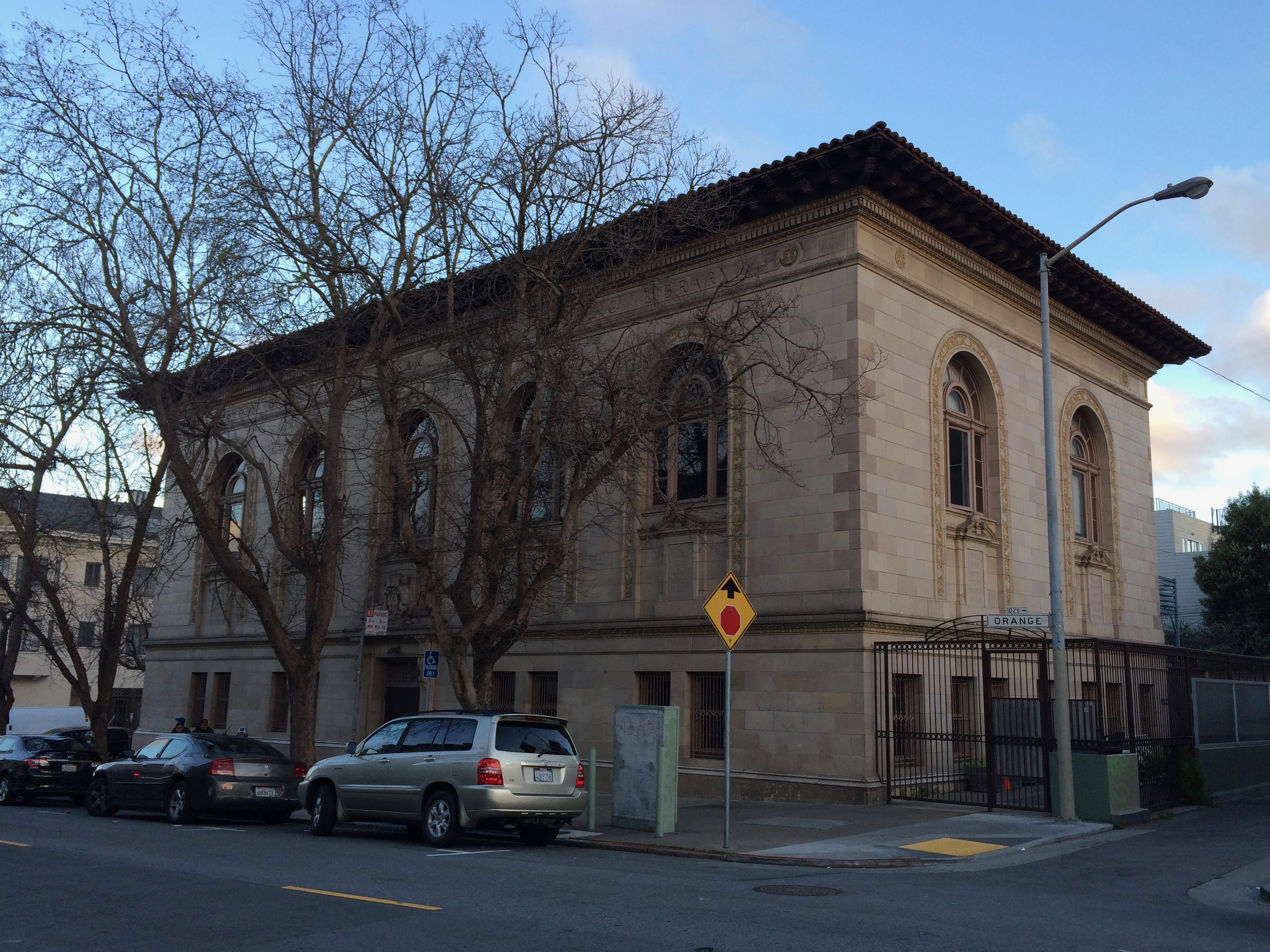
- The library in 2017, before the 2023–2026 renovation
- Alternative names: Biblioteca de la Mission

General information
- Type: Carnegie branch library
- Architectural style: Italian Renaissance
- Location: 3359 24th Street; San Francisco, California
- Coordinates: 37.7520°N 122.4198°W
- Completed: 1915
- Renovated: 1999; 2023–2026
- Cost: About $75,000 (equivalent to $1,700,000 in 2025)
- Renovation cost: $40.7 million (2023–2026)
- Owner: San Francisco Public Library

Technical details
- Floor area: 14,185 square feet (1,317.8 m^{2})

Design and construction
- Architect: G. Albert Lansburgh
- Other designers: Leo Lentelli (entrance sculpture)
- Designations: San Francisco Designated Landmark No. 234 (2004)

Renovating team
- Renovating firm: San Francisco Public Works (2023–2026)
- Main contractor: Amoroso Construction (2023–2026)

Website
- sfpl.org/locations/mission

Mission Branch Library is a branch of the San Francisco Public Library in the Mission District of San Francisco, California. It opened in 1888 as one of the city's first three branch libraries, in rented space. Its present building, completed in 1915, was the second of seven San Francisco branches built with a grant from Andrew Carnegie. G. Albert Lansburgh designed it in the Italian Renaissance style, and a sculptural group by Leo Lentelli stands over the original entrance on 24th Street. In the 1960s the branch started a Spanish-language book and film program for the largely Hispanic neighborhood. The building is San Francisco Designated Landmark (No. 234), listed as Carnegie Mission Branch Library.

A renovation completed in 1999 added seismic strengthening and an elevator, but removed the central staircase and moved the main entrance to Bartlett Street. The branch closed in 2020 for a second renovation, which cost $40.7 million. That project rebuilt the staircase, reopened the 24th Street entrance and enlarged the building, and the library reopened in November 2026.

== History ==
San Francisco opened its first three branch libraries in 1888, in rented space in North Beach, the Mission and Potrero Hill. The Mission branch opened that year with Laura Morton as librarian; Library Journal reported that it had cost less than $1,800.

The present building was the second of seven branches built with a Carnegie grant, which had been the subject of about twelve years of political conflict in the city. Beginning in 1914, $375,000 of the Carnegie funds went to new branches in the Richmond, the Mission, Noe Valley, the Sunset and Golden Gate Valley. In January 1915, James Bertram, who ran Carnegie's library grant program, objected to Lansburgh's plan because it put the main reading room on the upper floor. Reviewers he consulted also criticized the central stairway that rose into the reading room. George Mullin, secretary of the library trustees, defended the design and offered a meeting with Lansburgh, who kept an office in New York. The 2001 landmark nomination describes this as the start of a pattern repeated with the city's later Carnegie branches: Bertram objected, Lansburgh visited him, and Bertram gave way. For the Mission branch, Lansburgh met Bertram in New York, and Bertram approved the plans in March 1915. That month, Library Journal reported that the accepted plans were for a building costing $44,000. The building, at the corner of 24th and Bartlett streets, was completed in 1915. Library Journal reported in March 1916 that it had cost about $75,000 (equivalent to $1,700,000 in 2025), including a $49,500 grant from the Carnegie Corporation.

A children's room was added on the lower floor in 1923. In the 1960s, with help from a community organization, the Mission Rebels, the library set up a Spanish-language book and film program at the branch, which served a mostly Hispanic neighborhood. Community Memory, an early public computer bulletin board, also placed one of its terminals on the branch's counter, according to its co-founder Lee Felsenstein. A 1976 survey found that the branch had seven bilingual staff members and catalogued its own Spanish-language books, and that the library's bookmobile made special stops for Spanish speakers in the area. In 2009 the branch planted a small vegetable garden in its children's area. Children's questions about what to do with the produce led the library to start Biblio Bistro, a mobile cooking program, in 2016. The novelist Dorothy Bryant described her childhood visits to the branch in the essay "This Quiet Hall", published in Peter Booth Wiley's history of the library, and wrote that the branch figures prominently in the settings of two of her novels.

After the 1989 Loma Prieta earthquake, the building received seismic retrofitting and an elevator in a renovation completed in 1999. The renovation removed the central staircase and moved the main entrance from 24th Street to Bartlett Street. Neither change was popular with residents. On June 20, 2001, the city's Landmarks Preservation Advisory Board designated the Mission and Chinatown branches as landmarks. The Mission branch's designation as San Francisco Landmark No. 234 took effect on September 23, 2004.

When the city announced a second renovation in 2018, it estimated the cost at $19.8 million. The branch closed for the work in March 2020, and a temporary branch opened at 1234 Valencia Street in June 2022. San Francisco Public Works designed the project, and Amoroso Construction won the construction contract in 2022. Construction began in August 2023. It was delayed by neighbors' concerns about shoring and vibration, unforeseen site conditions, waits for Pacific Gas and Electric to de-energize an electrical vault, and the replacement of a subcontractor. The library reopened on November 14, 2026. Library officials put the project's cost at $40.7 million, including a $5.3 million grant from the California State Library. On the first day, 1,748 people visited and 1,769 books were checked out.

== Architecture and features ==
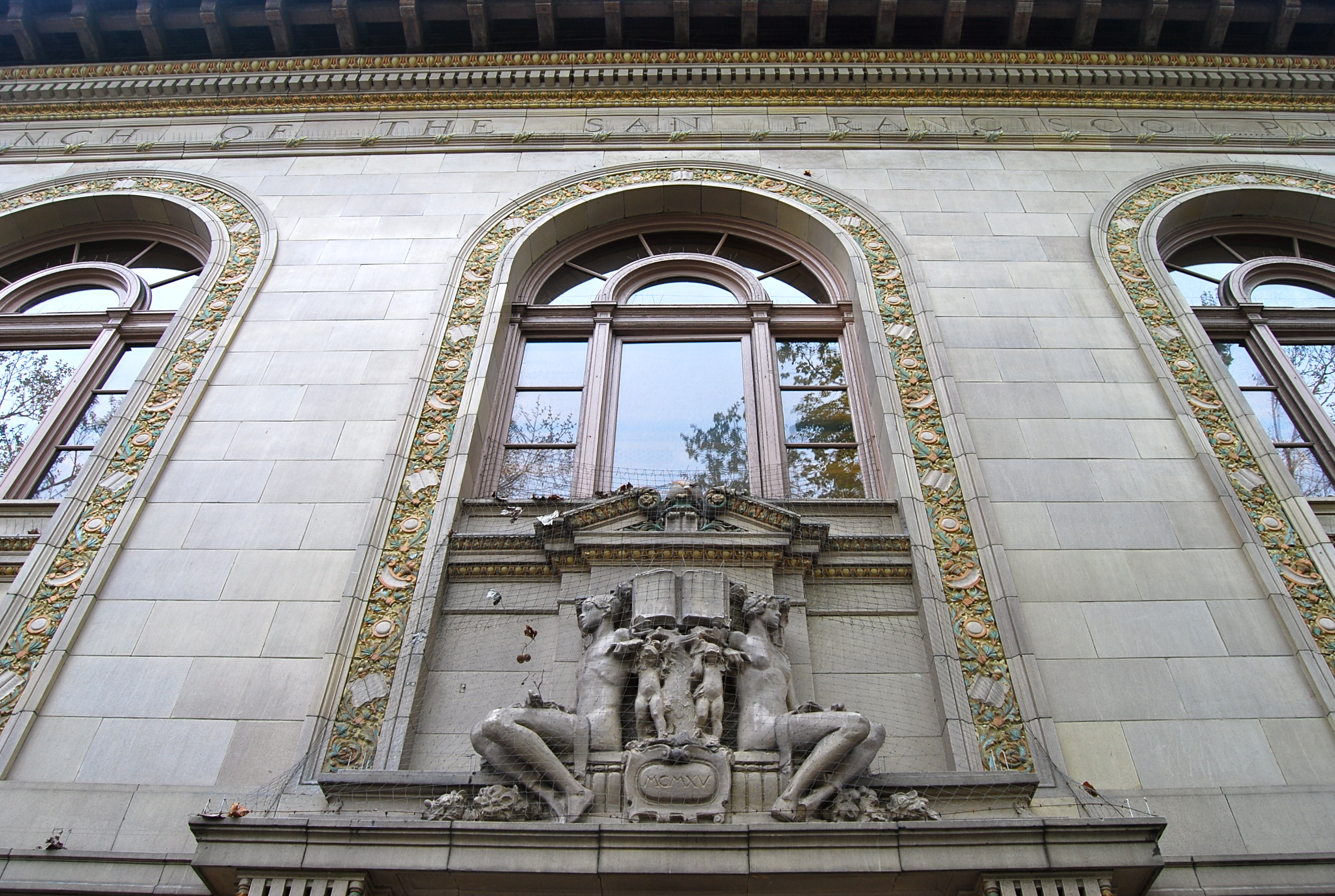
Leo Lentelli's sculptural group over the historic 24th Street entrance, 2010

The building combines Italian Renaissance and Spanish Eclectic styles. Its upper floor has large, recessed arched windows framed by terracotta arches above plaques bearing the names of authors. Lansburgh called it "an interesting example of an individual type of Spanish architecture". Wiley describes a green tile roof, glazed terracotta tile around the windows, and timbered ceilings, and writes that the branch was hailed as "one of the finest in the United States". The San Francisco Chronicle called it "big and stately enough to be a main library in most cities". A sculptural group over the historic 24th Street entrance is by the Italian-born sculptor Leo Lentelli.

The 2023–2026 renovation rebuilt the central staircase and reopened the 24th Street entrance. The stairs lead to the upstairs reading room, which keeps its oak shelving and original arched windows. Local firms restored the windows and terracotta. The project added 3,500 square feet (330 m^{2}), bringing the building to 14,185 square feet (1,317.8 m^{2}). A teen room occupies a second-floor addition above the children's room. A ground-floor community room for about 100 people is on the site of the former Bartlett Street entrance.

The staircase ends at Nopal de la Misión, a fused-glass window showing a prickly pear cactus, by the muralist Juana Alicia. A triptych from the 1990s by Emmanuel Catarino Montoya was conserved and reinstalled in the community room.

== See also ==
- List of Carnegie libraries in California
- List of San Francisco Designated Landmarks
