= G. Albert Lansburgh =

American architect (1876–1969)

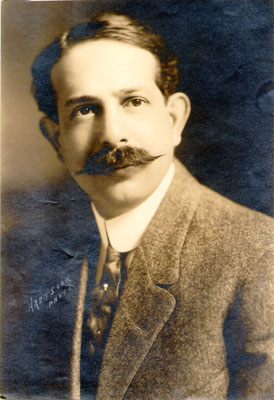
G. Albert Lansburgh portrait circa 1915

Gustave Albert Lansburgh (January 7, 1876 – April 1969) was an American architect largely known for his work on luxury cinemas and theaters. He was the principal architect of theaters on the West Coast from 1900 to 1930.

== Life and career ==
Lansburgh was born in Colombia (in a part of the country that is now Panama) and raised largely in San Francisco. After graduating from that city's Boys High School in 1894, Lansburgh enrolled in the University of California, Berkeley. While a student there, he worked part-time in the offices of prominent San Francisco architect Bernard Maybeck. Upon graduation, he moved to Paris, where in 1901, he was enrolled in the prestigious École des Beaux-Arts, earning a diploma in March 1906.

Lansburgh returned to the Bay Area in May 1906, one month after the region had been devastated by the San Francisco earthquake and subsequent fires. First in partnership with Bernard Julius Joseph for two years, then in his own practice, Lansburgh designed numerous buildings in the recovering city. Among these were four of the seven Carnegie branch libraries for the city and his first theater, for the San Francisco–based Orpheum Theater Circuit. In his long career thereafter, Lansburgh become known primarily as a theater architect, designing more than 50 of them, many for the Orpheum Circuit and its successor firm, RKO. He continued to design other buildings, including Oakland's Temple Sinai in 1914.

== Family ==
Lansburgh's son was director Larry Lansburgh.

== List of works ==
G. Albert Lansburgh's works include:

=== Theaters ===
==== Los Angeles ====
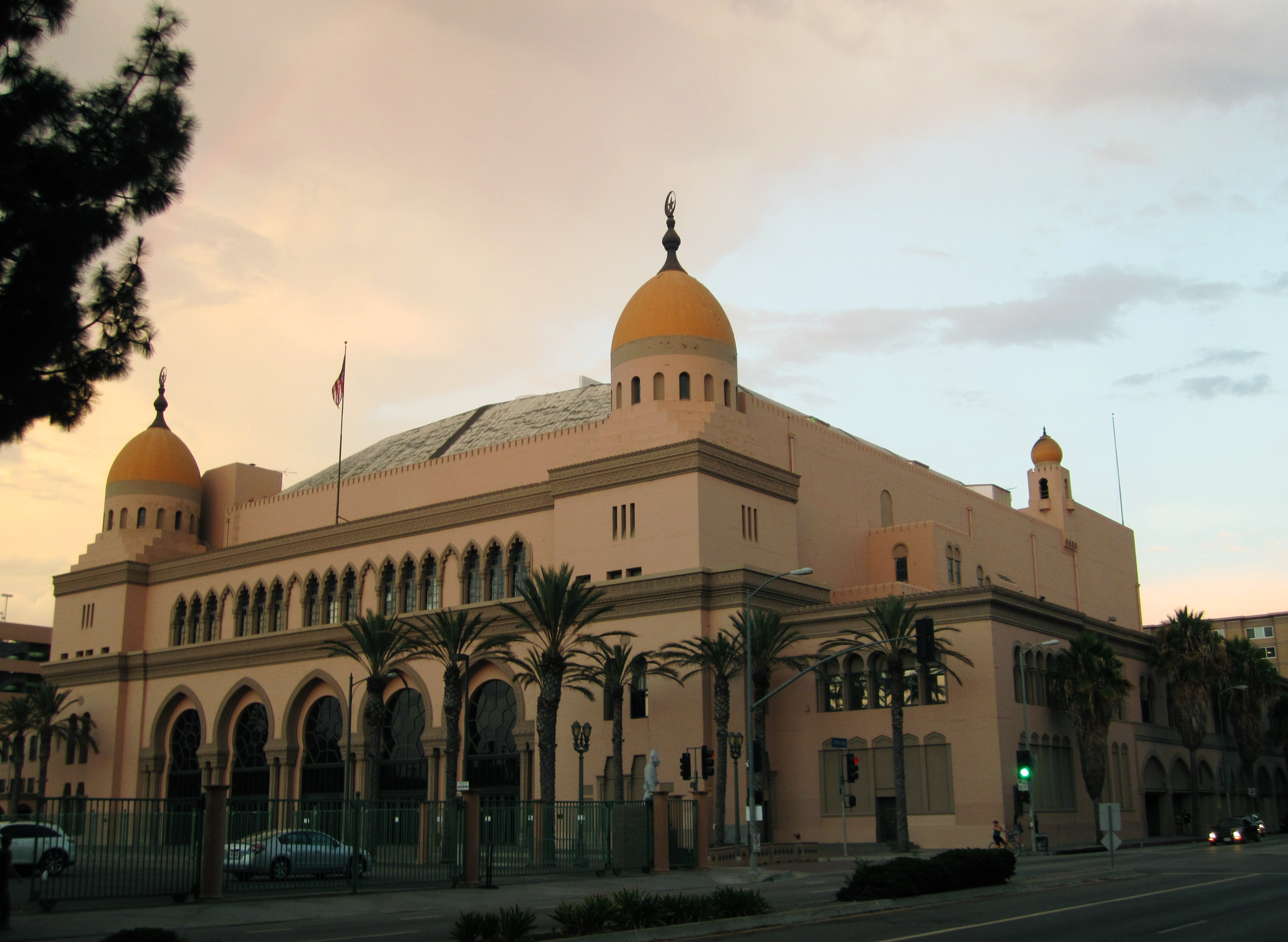
Shrine Auditorium

- Palace, 1910
- Orpheum, 1926
- Shrine Auditorium, 1926
- El Capitan, 1926
- Warner Hollywood, 1927
- Wiltern, 1931

==== San Francisco ====
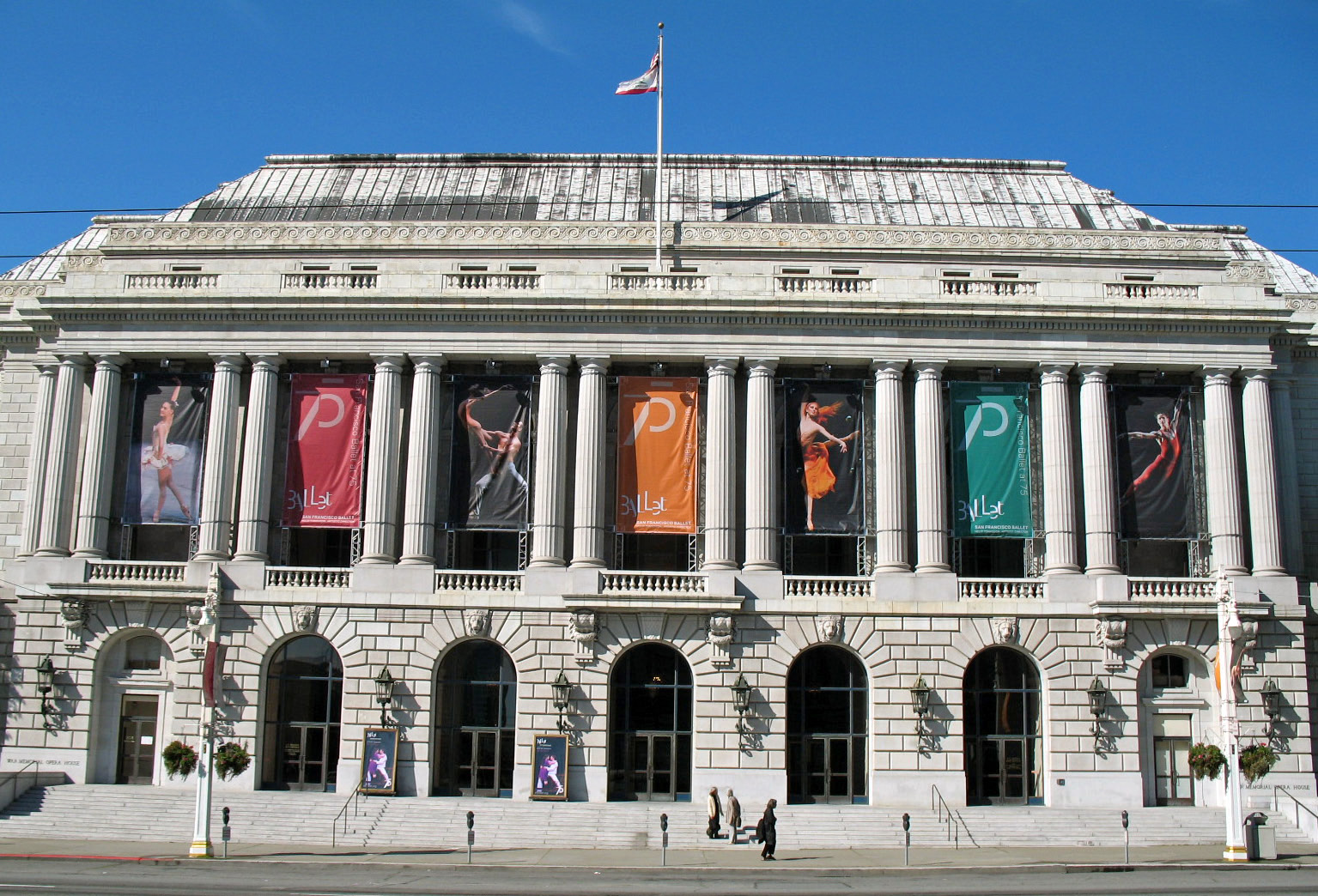
War Memorial Opera House

- Orpheum No. 3, 1909
- Golden Gate, 1921
- Warfield, 1922
- El Capitan, 1928
- War Memorial Opera House, 1932
- Grand, 1940 (collaborating architect)

==== Other ====
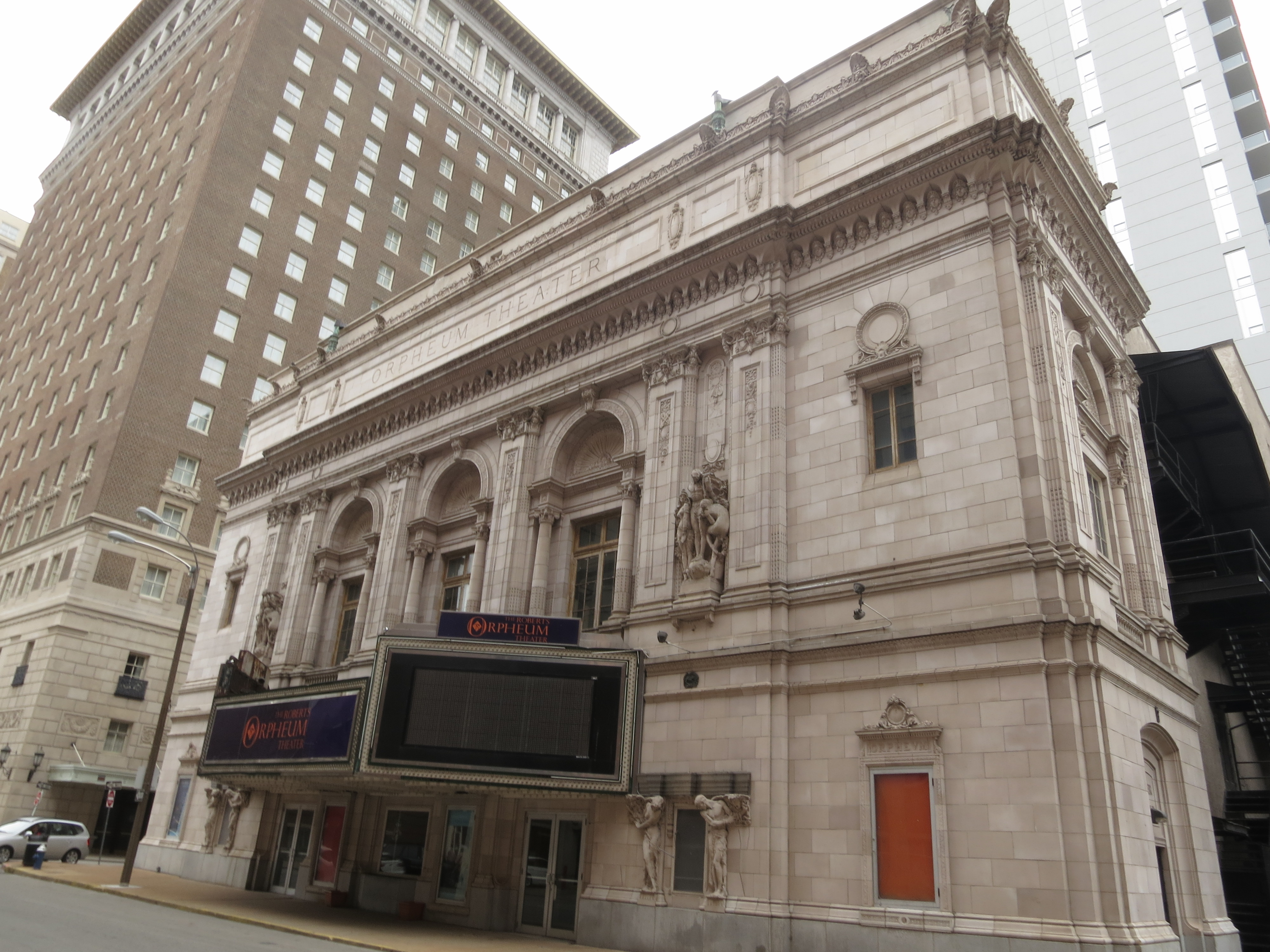
Orpheum Theater (St. Louis)

- Kinema, Fresno, 1913
- Orpheum No. 2, Salt Lake City, 1913
- Orpheum No. 2, Kansas City, 1915
- Orpheum, St. Louis, 1915
- Orpheum, New Orleans, 1917
- State-Lake, Chicago, 1919
- Martin Beck, New York City, 1924
- Sacramento Memorial Auditorium, Sacramento, 1926 (collaborating architect)

=== Other buildings ===
==== San Francisco Bay Area ====
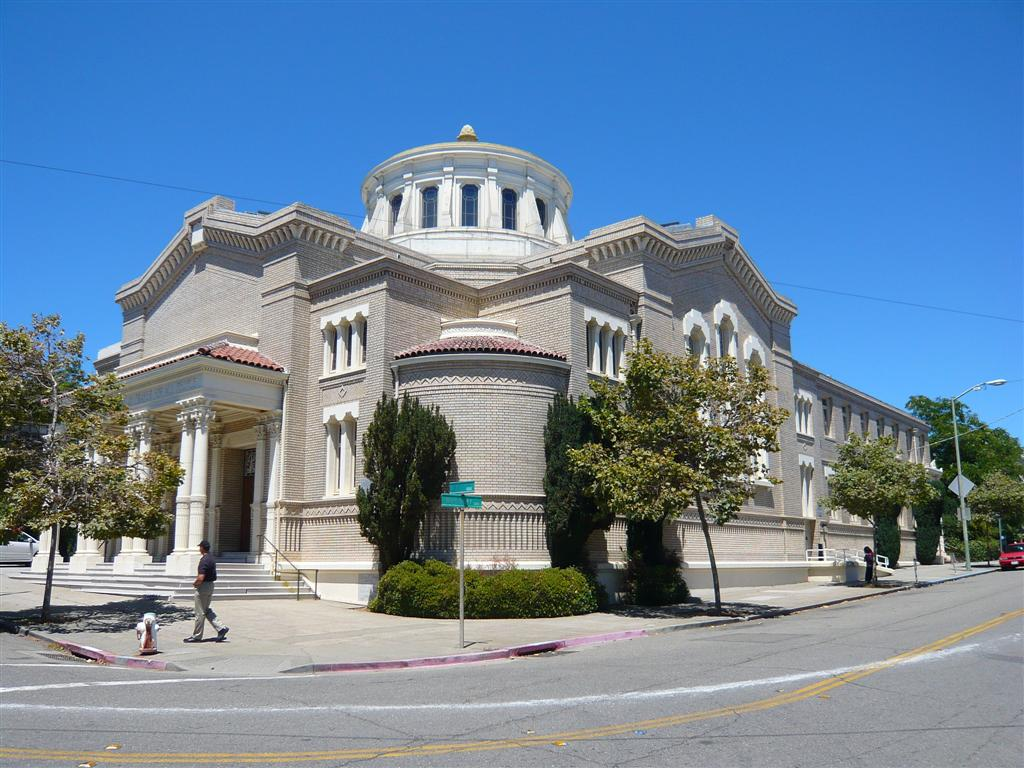
Temple Sinai

- Elkan Gunst Building, 1907
- M.A. Gunst Building, 1907
- Sachs Building, 1908
- Brown Mausoleum, 1909
- Temple Sinai, 1914
- 1st Hebrew Congregation Synagogue No. 3, 1914
- Clift Hotel, 1915
- Mission Branch Library, 1915
- Sunset Branch Library, 1918
- North Beach Branch Library, 1921
- Presidio Branch Library, 1921
- Temple Emanu-El #2, 1926
- American Trust Company Office Building, Berkeley, 1927
- Home of Peace Cemetery Mausoleum, 1936

== See also ==
- Alfred Henry Jacobs
