= Leo Lentelli =

American sculptor (1879–1961)

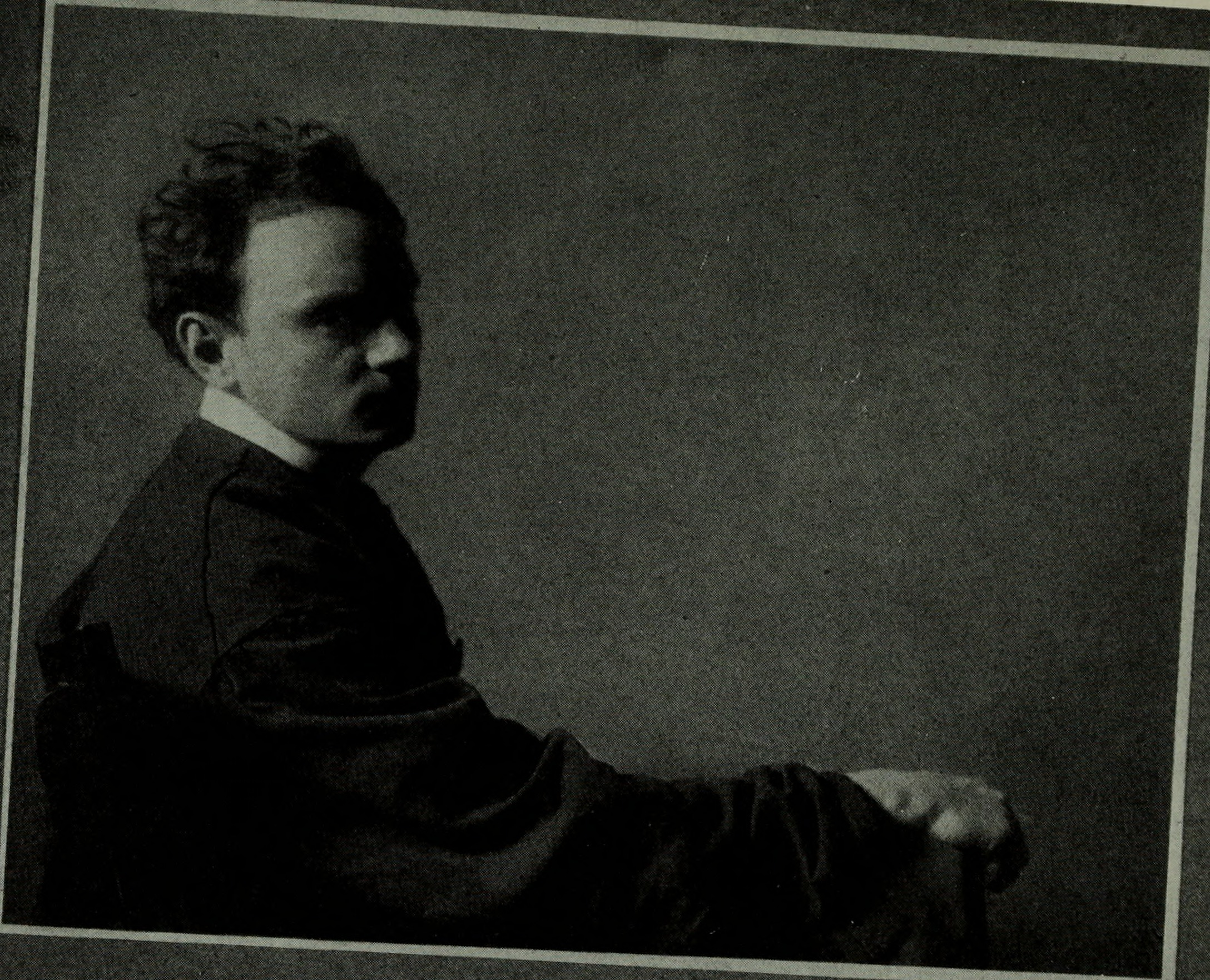
- Lentelli, c. 1917
- Born: October 20, 1879; Bologna, Italy
- Died: December 31, 1961 (aged 82); Rome, Italy
- Occupation: Sculptor

Leo Lentelli (20 October 1879 – 31 December 1961) was an Italian sculptor who immigrated to the United States. During his 52 years there, he created works throughout the country, notably in New York and San Francisco. He also taught sculpture.

== History ==
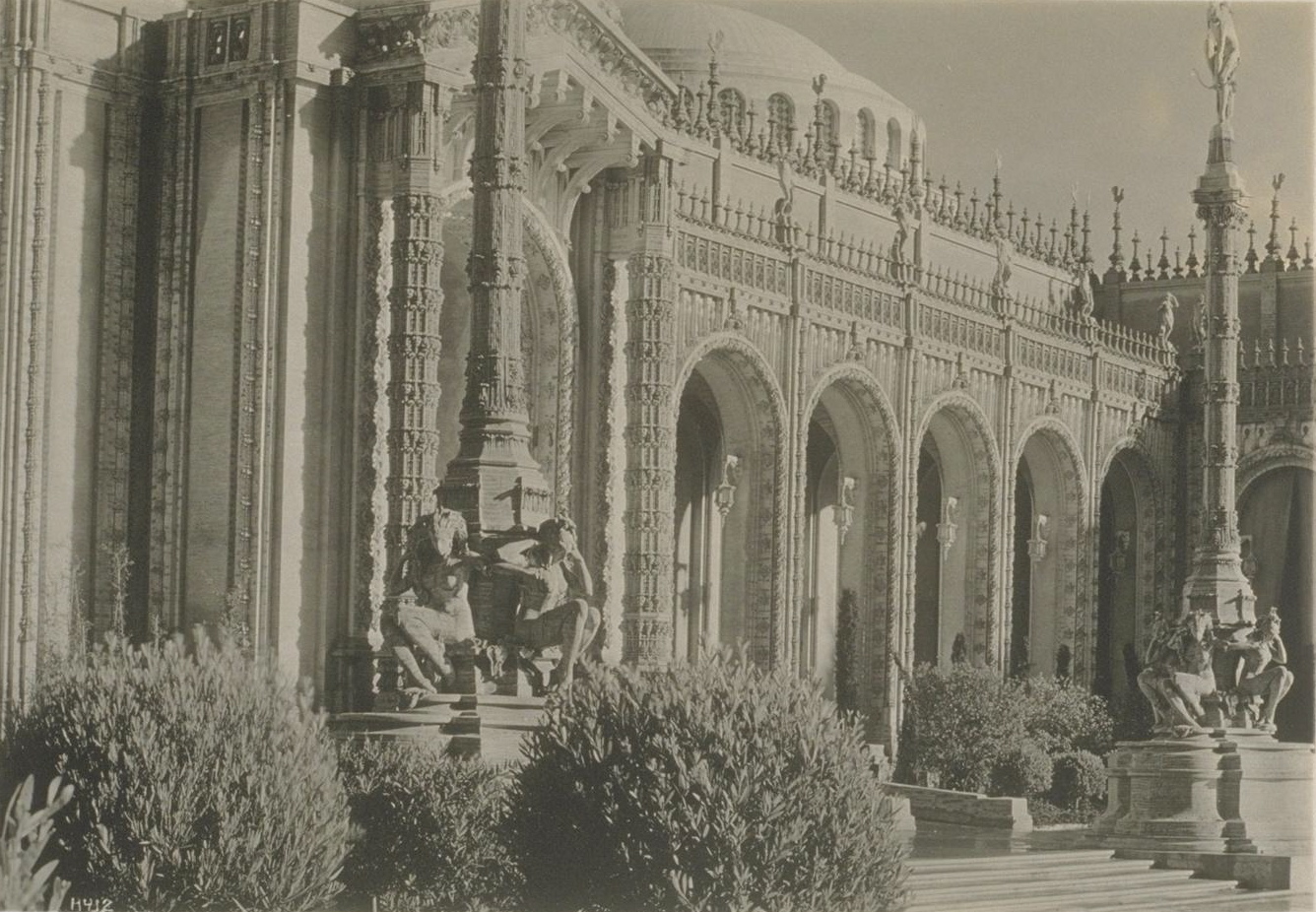
Water Sprites at Panama–Pacific International Exposition in San Francisco

Born in Bologna, Italy, on October 29, 1879, Leo Lentelli studied in Bologna and Rome and worked as a sculptor in his native land. Immigrating to the United States in 1903 at the age of 24, Lentelli initially assisted in the studios of several established sculptors. In 1911, he entered the Architectural League exhibition and won the Avery Prize. The following year he became a naturalized citizen of the United States. Chosen to provide sculptural ornament for the Panama-Pacific Exposition, Lentelli moved to San Francisco in 1914. He collaborated with Frederick George Richard Roth and Stirling Calder. Calder has been credited with aiding Lentelli in developing his own style. An example can be seen in his Water Sprites.

His long-limbed figures with hair and draperies in loose frills like seaweed made striking fountain statues and lent themselves well to architectural decoration. The surfaces were left rough for the sake of variety of texture and to give an effect of spontaneity.

He also participated as a sculptor in the city's artistic renewal, which took place after the 1906 earthquake and fire. While in San Francisco he taught at the California School of Fine Arts. Significant works from this period include the Five Symbolic Figures at the Old Main Library elevated above the street entrance of the Larkin Street entrance. Still a resident of San Francisco, he made the ornament for the Orpheum Theater, then known as the Historic American Theater, at Saint Louis and created two-figure groups depicting pioneers on the Dennis Sullivan Gateway at Denver, Colorado.

Returning to New York City, he began teaching at the Art Students League. He also taught at the Cooper Union and became an academician of the National Academy of Design. Lentelli gained fame through his The Savior with Sixteen Angels for the reredos at the Cathedral of St. John the Divine in New York, as well as his public sculpture for the Panama-Pacific Exposition in San Francisco. Among his important works are an equestrian statue of Robert E. Lee in Charlottesville, Virginia (collaboration with Henry Shrady), and a 1932 monument to Cardinal Gibbons located north of Meridian Hill Park in Washington, D.C. A benignity is achieved in the latter, its decorative element accented in the carved chair and graceful folds of the cassock. During the New Deal, Lentelli created four statues for the Post Office in Oyster Bay, Long Island, dated 1937: a terracotta bust of Theodore Roosevelt, two terracotta panels and ornamentation at the base of the flagpole. In the same period, he also created sculpture for the post office of North East, Pennsylvania. His statue of Apollo and a musical muse, located in a lunette of Steinway Hall on 57th Street in New York City, was covered when the building was sold, but is again on display. Other ornamental figures include Bagnante, a Diana, and Leda. In addition to figures, Lentelli sculpted panels and bas-reliefs for many distinguished buildings. He ornamented a frieze on the Free Academy building at Corning, New York, with a panel of children's figures. Lentelli's bas-reliefs on the International Building at Rockefeller Center are considered among his most important works.

Among Leo Lentelli's marks of recognition are the 1922 Medal of Honor of the Architectural League of New York and gold medal at the National Academy of Design exhibition in 1927. He was a fellow of the National Sculpture Society, an associate member of the National Academy of Design and a member of the Architectural League of New York. In 1955, Lentelli retired to Italy and died on December 31, 1961, in Rome.

The Charlottesville Robert E Lee statue was removed in 2021 in the aftermath of riots before being melted down in 2023.

== Other works ==
Though best known for his work at Rockefeller Center in New York City, he created sculpture which can be seen at a number of other locations, including the following:

- Brookgreen Gardens, South Carolina
- United States Department of Justice, Washington, DC
- U.S. General Service Administration, Washington, DC
- Oakland Museum, Oakland, California
- The Archer, San Francisco Museum of Art
- Pennsylvania Academy of Design
- Cathedral Church of Christ the King, Kalamazoo, Michigan
- Liberty Building, Buffalo, New York (the twin statues of liberty facing east and west atop the roof)
- The Breakers, Palm Beach, Florida
- Sculptural group over the entrance of the Mission Branch Library, San Francisco

== Images ==
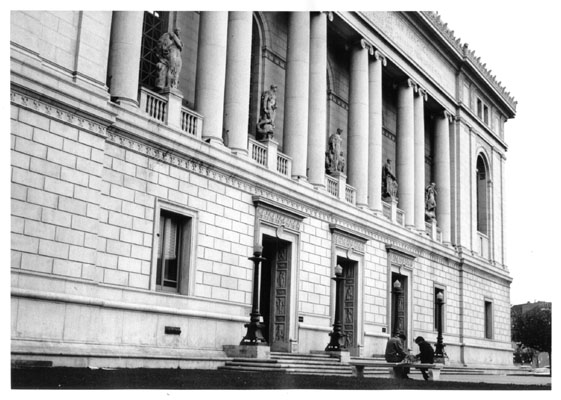
Five Symbolic Figures at the Old San Francisco Public Library

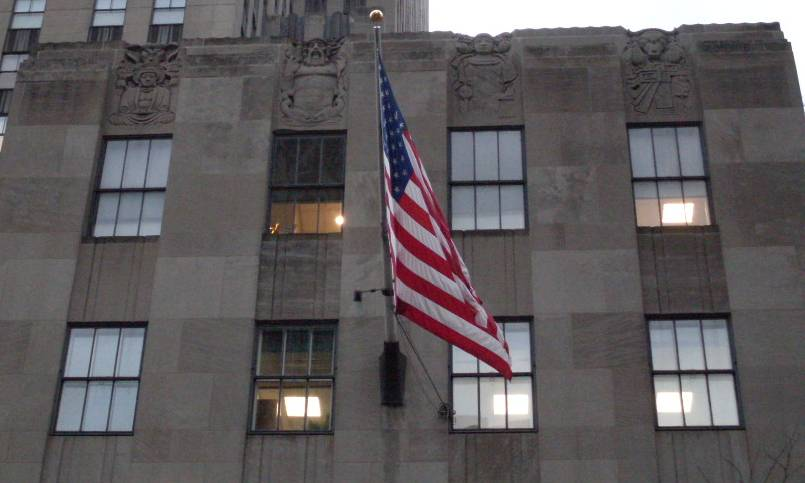
Bas reliefs representing the four continents at Rockefeller Center

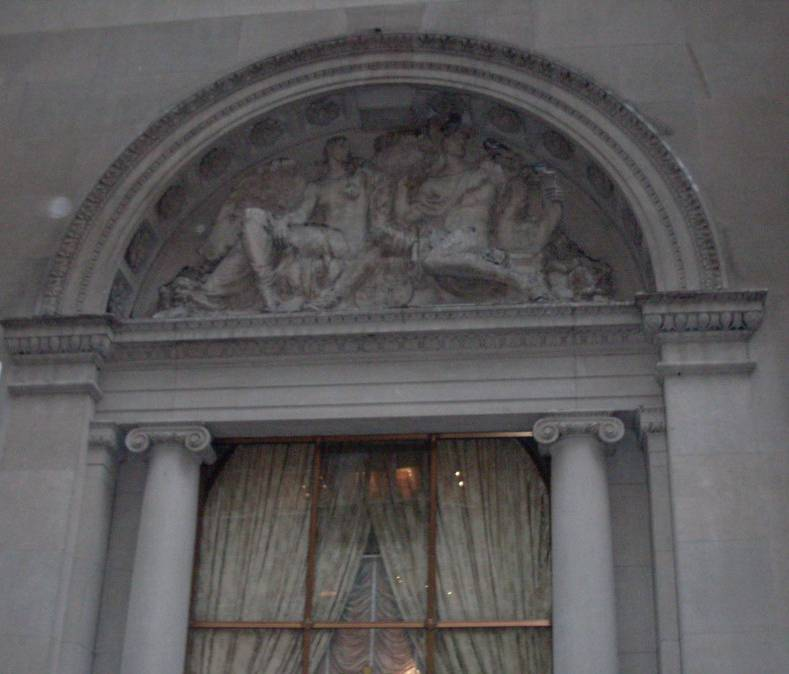
Apollo and musical muse, Steinway Hall, New York City

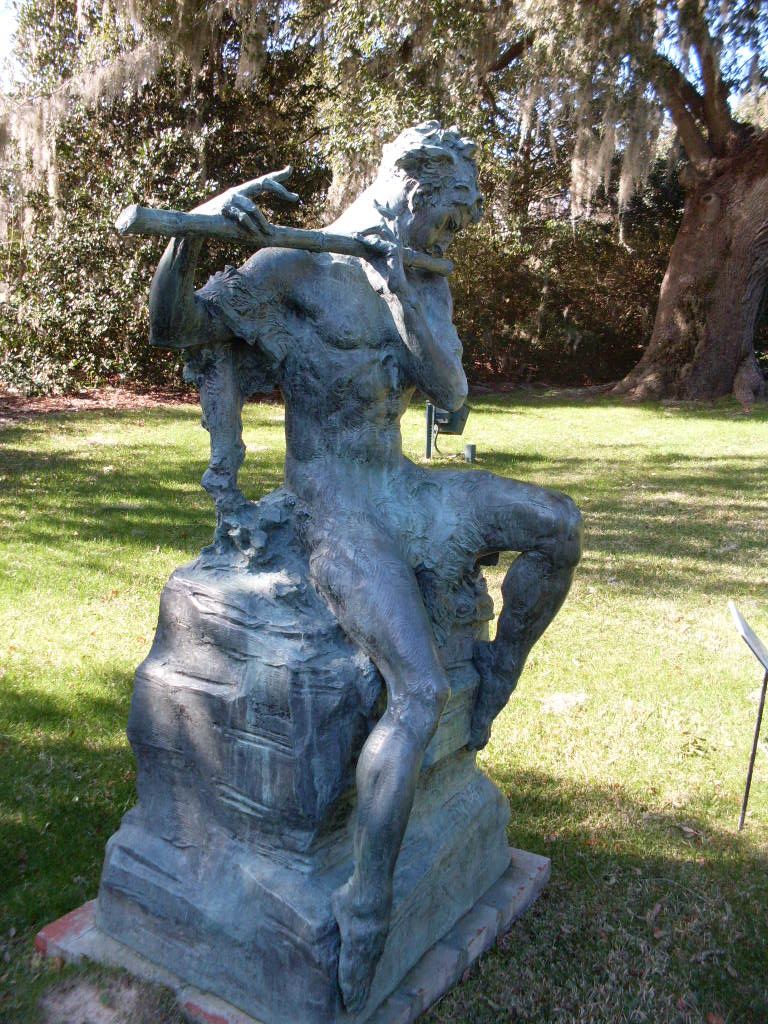
Faun, Brookgreen Gardens, South Carolina

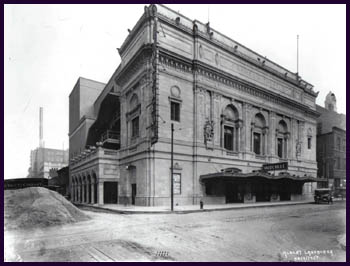
Lentelli ornamentation of Orpheum Theater, St. Louis, Missouri

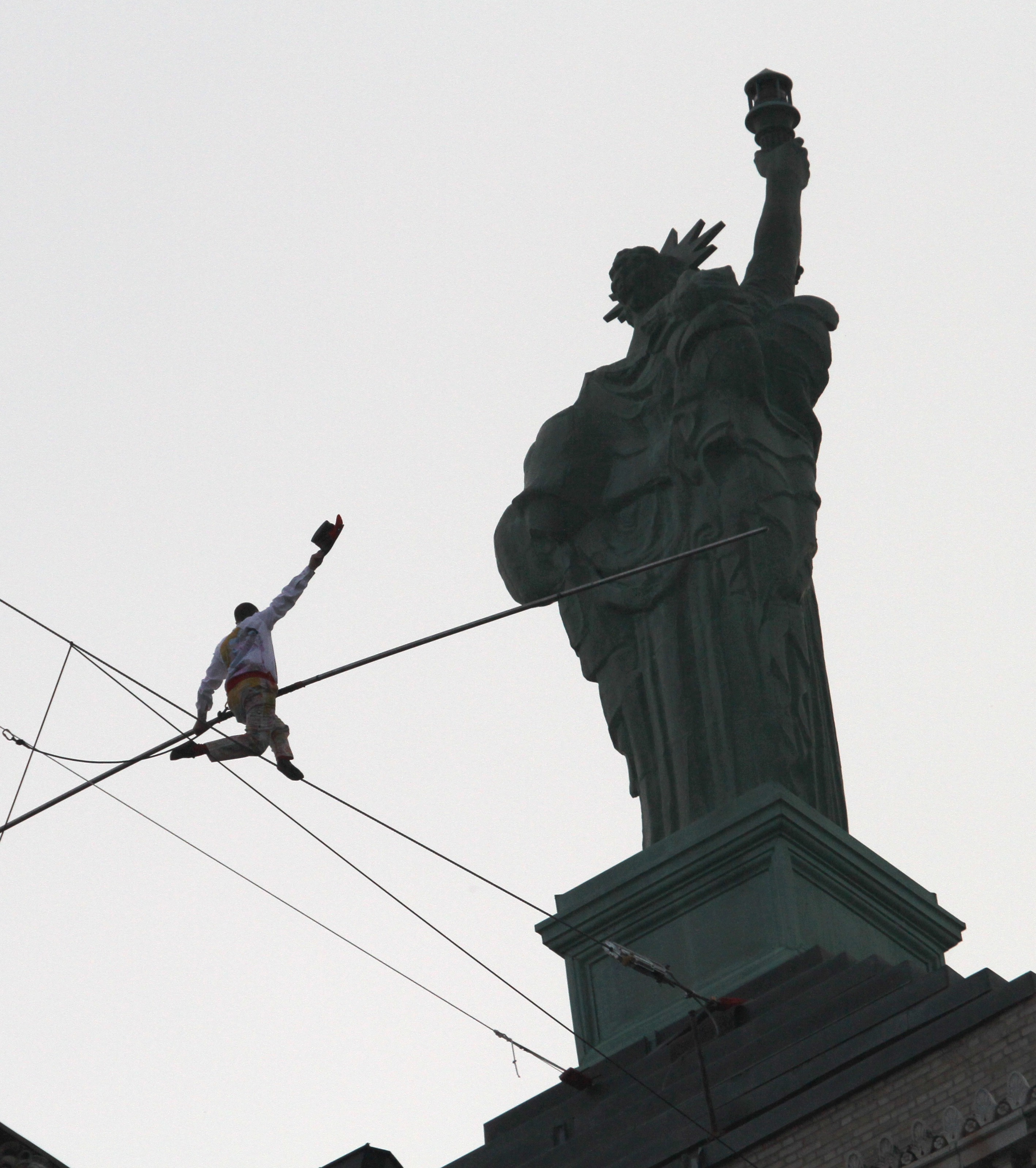
Didier Pasquette walking a tightrope between the twin statues atop the Liberty Building in downtown Buffalo, New York, 2010

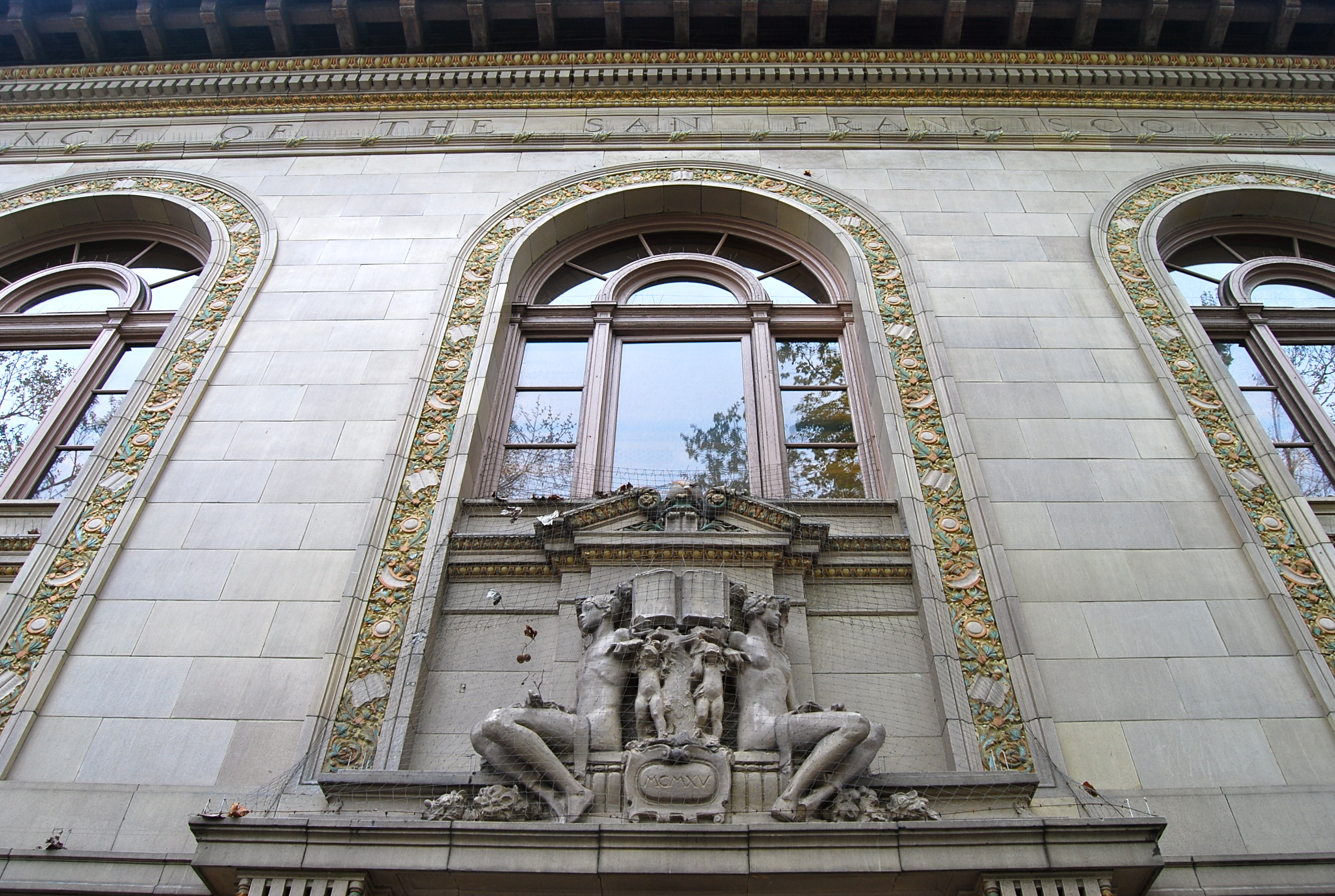
Group over the entrance of the Mission Branch Library, San Francisco
