= List of San Francisco placename etymologies =

This is a list of place name etymologies in San Francisco, California.

== Place names ==
Place	Namesake	Notes
Alamo Square		Named for a cottonwood tree (alamo in Spanish) that grew on Alamo Hill.
Alemany Boulevard	Joseph Sadoc Alemany	The Alemany Maze is also named for Alemany.
Alvarado Street	Juan Bautista Alvarado	
Ambrose Bierce Alley	Ambrose Bierce	Formerly Aldrich Alley, named for Mark Aldrich; renamed in 1988.
Anza Street	Juan Bautista de Anza	
Arguello Boulevard	José Darío Argüello	
Ashbury Street	Munroe Ashbury	Ashbury was a member of the San Francisco Board of Supervisors from 1864 to 1870.
Baker Beach		The John Henry Baker family, dairy farmers.
Baker Street	Edward Dickinson Baker	San Francisco's Baker Street, extending from Haight Street at Buena Vista Park, past the Palace of Fine Arts to the marina within the Golden Gate National Recreation Area at Marina Boulevard, is named after Baker.
Balance Street	Storeship called "The Balance"	The Balance was captured during the War of 1812 and arrived in San Francisco in 1849, where she served as a storeship docked at the intersection of Front and Jackson. She was broken apart and buried at the end of Pacific Wharf which is now Balance Street
Balboa Street	Vasco Núñez de Balboa	
Bartlett Street	Washington Allon Bartlett	Bartlett was the first alcalde (mayor) of San Francisco and is sometimes confused with Governor Washington Montgomery Bartlett, the city's twentieth mayor
Beale Street	Edward Fitzgerald Beale	
Bennington Street	Battle of Bennington	
Bernal Heights	José Cornelio Bernal	In 1839, José Cornelio Bernal (1796–1842) was given a land grant to Rancho Rincon de las Salinas y Potrero Viejo, part of which comprised present-day Bernal Heights.
Bernal Heights Boulevard	José Cornelio Bernal	See Bernal Heights.
Bernice Street		May have been named for a prostitute who worked in the alley.
Birch Street	The Birch tree	Several Hayes Valley streets are named for plants and trees.
Bluxome Street	Isaac Bluxome Jr.	Bluxome led troops against the Hounds in 1849; he served as Secretary of the Vigilante Committees of 1851 and 1856.
Bonifacio Street	Andrés Bonifacio	
Bradford Street	William Bradford	Bradford Street is one of two streets in Bernal Heights named for Pilgrim Fathers; the other is Brewster Street.
Brannan Street	Samuel Brannan	
Brenham Place	Charles James Brenham	
Brewster Street	William Brewster	Brewster Street is one of two streets in Bernal Heights named for Pilgrim Fathers; the other is Bradford Street.
Broderick Street	David C. Broderick	
Bryant Street	Edwin Bryant	
Buchanan Street	John C. Buchanan	It had been assumed that Buchanan Street was named after James Buchanan, the President of the United States who took office in March 1857. However, an 1856 map was found to have also included the street name. It is probable then that the street was actually named for the local pioneer John C. Buchanan.
Burnett Avenue	Peter Burnett	
Bush Street	J.P. Bush	May have been named after a cabin boy J. P. Bush who was an assistant to city mapper, Jasper O'Farrell. At least twice, "Bush" street signs along the 2.6-mile stretch were vandalized to honor a political opponent of a Republican named Bush. Days before the 1988 election, dozens of signs were covered with "Dukakis" stickers. After the 2009 inauguration following the 2008 election, vandals covered signs throughout the street's length with "Obama" stickers; some signs were also vandalized shortly after Obama's victory. A man was charged in the 1988 incident, and San Francisco city officials stressed the cost of removing the stickers in the 2009 incident.: Per a 1918 San Francisco Chronicle article, Bush Street is named after a physician, Jonathan Platt Bush (J.P. Bush).
Cabrillo Street	Juan Rodriguez Cabrillo	
California Street	State of California	
Capp Street	C.S. Capp	Capp was secretary of the San Francisco Homestead Union, the first homestead association in San Francisco. The street runs through the lands of the association.
Carl Larsen Park		Carl Gustave Larsen (1844–1928), Danish immigrant who donated the land for the park.
Castro Street	José Castro	A Californio leader of Mexican opposition to U.S. rule in California in the 19th century, and alcalde (mayor) of Alta California from 1835 to 1836.
Cesar Chavez Street	César Chávez	Until 1995, it was named "Army Street." (It was so named because it terminated at the Army Pier in the Bay. Twenty-Sixth Street was formerly called Navy Street because it terminated at the Navy Pier.)
Chattanooga Street	Battle of Chattanooga	
Chenery Street	Richard Chenery	Chenery was a gold rush pioneer
Clark Street	William S. Clark	
Cole Street	Cornelius Cole	
Coleman Street	William T. Coleman	
Colin P Kelly Junior Street	Colin Kelly	
Cora Street	Charles Cora	Cora, a gambler and consort of prostitutes, was lynched by vigilantes in 1856.
Davidson Street	George Davidson	
Davis Street	William Heath Davis	
De Haro Street	Francisco de Haro	First alcalde (mayor) of Yerba Buena (now San Francisco)
Dirk Dirksen Place	Dirk Dirksen	Formerly Rowland Street (renamed in 2009)
Divisadero Street	From the Spanish	In Spanish, divisadero means a point from which one can look far. The Spanish name for Lone Mountain was El Divisadero.
Dolores Street	Mission Dolores	Also named after the creek that used to run through the Mission, Arroyo de Nuestra Señora de los Dolores, or "Our Lady of Sorrows Creek."
Douglass Street	Frederick Douglass	Named for the noted abolitionist.
Duboce Park	Victor Donglain Duboce	Duboce (1856–1900) was a member of the Board of Supervisors and a colonel in the Spanish–American War.
Duboce Street	Victor Donglain Duboce	See Duboce Park (called Ridley Street prior to 1900).
Duncan Street	Chapman Duncan	Duncan was a Mormon acquaintance of John M. Horner, the founder of Noe Valley (as Horner's addition), who gave Duncan Street its name.
Eddy Street	William M. Eddy	Eddy was City Surveyor in 1850. He completed the survey of the city between Larkin and Ninth streets and the bay.
Elizabeth Street	Elizabeth Horner	Wife of John Meirs Horner, owner of Horner's Addition, the original name of Noe Valley.
Embarcadero Plaza	Justin Herman	Formerly Justin Herman Plaza, named for Justin Herman, who headed the San Francisco Redevelopment Agency from 1959 to 1971. In the 1960s, Herman's urban renewal policies displaced many African-Americans in San Francisco's Western Addition. The name was changed in 2017.
Evans Avenue	Robley D. Evans	
Fair Oaks Street	Battle of Fair Oaks	
Fallon Place	Thomas Fallon	
Farnsworth Lane	Philo Farnsworth	
Fell Street	William Fell	Fell was a Danish immigrant who came to San Francisco in 1849. He was a merchant and member of the Society of California Pioneers.
Fella Place		May have been named for the madame of a brothel located in the alley.
Fillmore Street	Millard Fillmore	
Flood Avenue	James C. Flood	
Folsom Street	Captain Joseph Folsom	
Franklin Street	Benjamin Franklin	
Fremont Street	John Charles Fremont	
Frida Kahlo Way	Frida Kahlo	Formerly Phelan Avenue, named for James D. Phelan. Citing racism on the part of Phelan's son, James Duval Phelan, the name was changed in 2018.
Fulton Street	Robert Fulton	
Funston Avenue	Frederick Funston	Funston Avenue, between 12th and 14th Avenue, should be 13th Avenue, but the number 13 is considered bad luck.
Geary Street (Note: Geary Boulevard is the name west of Van Ness Ave; before 1909, the road west of Presidio Ave was named Point Lobos Ave. In 1960, Geary Street between Van Ness and Presidio Aves was also renamed Geary Boulevard.)	John W. Geary	
Gellert Drive		Carl and Fred Gellert, owners of the Standard Building Company that developed Lakeshore Park
Gene Friend Way		Gene Friend was a long-time San Francisco public servant.
Glen Park	Glen Canyon Park	
Golden Gate	Golden Gate in Constantinople	John C. Fremont named the Golden Gate after one of the Walls of Constantinople. The Golden Gate Bridge and Golden Gate Ave. take their names from the Golden Gate.
Gough Street	Charles H. Gough	Gough, a milkman, was one of three aldermen appointed in 1855 to lay out and name the streets of the Western Addition.
Grant Avenue	Ulysses S. Grant	Formerly called Calle De La Fundacion and Dupont Street for Samuel Francis Du Pont.
Green Street	Talbot H. Green	Green (real name Paul Geddes, an embezzler) was a pioneer, city councilman, treasurer of the Society of California Pioneers, and mayoral candidate.
Guerrero Street	Francisco Guerrero	Former alcalde (mayor) of Yerba Buena (now San Francisco)
Haight Street	Weltha Ann Buell Haight	Haight managed the San Francisco Protestant Orphan Asylum on Haight Street near Market Street.
Harding Road	Warren G. Harding	
Harriet Street		May have been named for a prostitute who worked in the alley.
Harrison Street	Edward H. Harrison	Harrison, a lawyer, was a quartermaster's clerk for the First New York volunteers and collector of the port.
Hayes Street	Thomas Hayes	Hayes was a county clerk from 1853 to 1856; he started the first Market Street Railway franchise.
Hayes Valley	Thomas Hayes	
Hickory Street	The Hickory Tree	Several Hayes Valley streets are named for plants and trees.
Howard Street	William Davis Merry Howard	
Hyde Street	George Hyde	Hyde was the mayor of San Francisco in 1847–1848.
Ina Coolbrith Park	Ina Coolbrith	
Ingalls Street	Rufus Ingalls	
Islais Creek		From a Salinan word, slay or islay, a type of wild cherry.
Irving Street	Washington Irving	
Isadora Duncan Lane	Isadora Duncan	
Ivy Street	Ivy	Several Hayes Valley streets are named for plants and trees.
Jack Kerouac Alley	Jack Kerouac	Formerly Adler Place (renamed in 1988)
Jack Micheline Alley	Jack Micheline	Formerly Pardee Alley (renamed in 2003)
Jackson Street	Andrew Jackson	
Jefferson Street	Thomas Jefferson	
Jerrold Avenue	Douglas William Jerrold	
Jerry Garcia Street	Jerry Garcia	Formerly Harrington Street. The street was renamed in 2025.
Jersey Street	New Jersey	Named for the state where John Meirs Horner, owner of Horner's Addition, the original name of Noe Valley, was born
John F. Shelley Drive	John F. Shelley	
John Muir Drive	John Muir	
Jones Street	Elbert P. Jones	Jones was editor of the California Star and secretary of the town council.
Joost Avenue	Behrend Joost	Joost built the first electric railway going south from downtown San Francisco.
José Sarria Court	José Sarria	An honorary section of 16th Street in the Castro neighborhood, José Sarria was an early gay and transgender rights pioneer in San Francisco.
Juan Bautista Circle	Juan Bautista de Anza	
Judah Street	Theodore Judah	
Junipero Serra Boulevard	Junipero Serra	
Kearny Street	Stephen W. Kearny	The street is not named for Denis Kearney.
Keyes Avenue	Erasmus D. Keyes	
Kezar Drive	Mary Kezar	Kezar donated $100,000 to the San Francisco Park Commission in 1922 and funded the construction of Kezar Stadium.
Kezar Stadium	Mary Kezar	See Kezar Drive.
King Street	Thomas Butler King	
Starr King Way	Thomas Starr King	Thomas Starr King was a minister credited with preventing California from becoming a separate republic during the Civil War.
Kirkham Street	General Ralph W. Kirkham	Kirkham was a hero of the Mexican–American War.
Laguna Street	Washerwoman's Lagoon	Named for a lagoon located at the intersection of Greenwich and Gough Streets.
Laguna Honda Boulevard		Laguna honda means "deep lagoon" in Spanish.
Laguna Honda Reservoir	Laguna Honda Reservoir	
Lane Street	Levi Cooper Lane	
Lapham Way	Roger Lapham	
Lapu Lapu Street	Lapulapu	
Larkin Street	Thomas Larkin	
Larsen Peak		Carl Gustave Larsen (1844–1928), Danish immigrant who donated the land for Golden Gate Heights Park, where Larsen Peak is located.
Laussat Street	Pierre Clément de Laussat	
Lawton Street	Henry Ware Lawton	
Leavenworth Street	Thaddeus M. Leavenworth	Leavenworth was mayor from October 1848 to August 1849.
Le Conte Avenue	John Le Conte	
Lech Walesa Street	Lech Wałęsa	Formerly part of Ivy Street, it carried the name from 1986 to 2014.
Leese Street	Jacob P. Leese	
Leidesdorff Street	William Leidesdorff	Leidesdorff was biracial U.S. citizens in California of Carib, Danish and Jewish ancestry and a successful enterprising businessman. 1845 he was President of the San Francisco school board and also elected as City Treasurer. The part of the street between Pine and California was formerly called Pauper's Alley.
Lendrum Street	John Lendrum	Lendrum was commander of the Presidio in 1858 and Fort Point in 1861.
Liggett Avenue	Hunter Liggett	
Linares Avenue	Ygnacio Antonio Linares	Linares was a member of Juan Bautista de Anza's 1775–1776 expedition to Alta California.
Lincoln Boulevard	Abraham Lincoln	
Lincoln Court	Abraham Lincoln	
Lincoln Way	Abraham Lincoln	
Linden Street	The Linden tree	Several Hayes Valley streets are named for plants and trees.
Lombard Street	Lombard Street in Philadelphia	Also said to be named for Lombard banking.
Lover's Lane	1806 love affair	Named for the doomed romance of Maria de la Concepcion Arguello, granddaughter of José Darío Argüello, and Nicolai Petrovich Rezanov, chamberlain to the czar of Russia.
Lyon Street	Nathaniel Lyon	
Lundy's Lane	Battle of Lundy's Lane	
Maiden Lane		Named after the Maiden Lane in London or New York.
Main Street	Charles Main	Main (1817–1906) was a wealthy ship chandler and harnessmaker.
Market Street		Named by surveyor Jasper O'Farrell after Market Street in Philadelphia.
Martin Avenue	Martin Ron	Ron was a land surveyor. The street was named in 2016.
Mason Street	Richard Barnes Mason	
McAllister Street	Matthew Hall McAllister	
Mission Street		Named for Mission Dolores.
Montcalm Street	Louis-Joseph de Montcalm	
Montgomery Street	John B. Montgomery	
Moraga Street	José Joaquín Moraga	
Moultrie Street	William Moultrie	
Mount Sutro	Adolph Sutro	Local real estate tycoon, later the 24th mayor of San Francisco.
Nelson Rising Way	Nelson Rising	
Noe Street	José de Jesús Noé	The last Mexican alcalde (mayor) of Yerba Buena (now San Francisco)
Noriega Street	José de la Guerra y Noriega	Governor of Alta California under Mexican rule
Octavia Street (Note: Octavia Boulevard, built in 2005, lies between the northbound and southbound lanes of Octavia Street for its entire four-block length.)	Octavia Gough	Sister of Charles H. Gough for whom Gough Street is named. See Gough Street.
O'Farrell Street	Jasper O'Farrell	
Ortega Street	José Francisco Ortega	
O'Shaughnessy Boulevard	Michael O'Shaughnessy	
Otis Street	James Otis	
Pacheco Street	Salvio Pacheco	Owner of the Rancho Monte del Diablo in the East Bay.
Palou Avenue	Francisco Palóu	
Patterson Street	William Patterson	Pioneer floriculturist; Golden Acre Nursery established 1885 on Bernal Heights
Pierce Street	Franklin Pierce	
Point Lobos Avenue		Lobo means "wolf" in Spanish. Spanish explorers named Point Lobos after the barking of sea lions, which sounded to them like wolves.
Polk Street	James K. Polk	
Portola Avenue	Gaspar de Portolà	
Potrero Avenue	From the Spanish potrero	In Spanish, potrero means "pasture." The Potrero comprised grazing land for common use.
Powell Street	Dr. William J. Powell	Powell was a surgeon of the U. S. sloop of war Warren, which was active during the conquest of California.
Precita Avenue	Precita Creek	
Ramona Avenue	Ramona, the novel	
Reservoir Street		Named for a reservoir formerly located at Church and Market Streets, the location of Reservoir Street. Water for the reservoir came from a spring behind Sutro Reservoir, the headwaters of Laguna Honda.
Rivera Street	Fernando Rivera y Moncada	Governor of Alta California under Mexican rule
Rizal Street	José Rizal	
Rolph Street	James Rolph	
Rose Street	The rose	Several Hayes Valley streets are named for plants and trees.
Sanchez Street	Family of José Antonio Sanchez	
Sansome Street	Sansom Street in Philadelphia	
Scott Street	Winfield Scott	
Selby Street	Thomas Henry Selby	
Shafter Avenue	James McMillan Shafter	
Sheridan Street	General Philip Henry Sheridan	
Shotwell Street	J.M. Shotwell	Shotwell was a cashier at Alsop & Co.’s Bank, secretary of the Merchant's Exchange, and treasurer of the San Francisco Homestead Union.
Shrader Street.	A.J. Shrader	Shrader was a city supervisor from 1865 to 1873.
Simonds Loop	George S. Simonds	
Sloat Boulevard	Commodore John D. Sloat	
Spear Street	Nathan Spear	
Stanyan Street	Charles H. Stanyan	Stanyan was a city supervisor from 1866 to 1869.
Steiner Street	L. Steiner	Steiner was a waterman (water deliverer).
Steuart Street	William Morris Stewart	Born Stewart, changed his last name to Steuart upon arriving in San Francisco in 1850.
Stevenson Street	Jonathan D. Stevenson	
Stockton Street	Robert F. Stockton	
Sutter Street	John Sutter	
Taraval Street	Sigismundo Taraval	
Taylor Street	Zachary Taylor	
Terry A Francois Boulevard	Terry Francois	
Thomas Avenue	General George H. Thomas	General Thomas was stationed in the Presidio in 1869.
Tom Waddell Street	Tom Waddell	Formerly part of Ivy Street, it was renamed in 2014.
Tonquin Street	The American merchant ship Tonquin	
Townsend Street	Dr. John Townsend	Townsend was a physician in early San Francisco; he practiced in the city for 66 years.
Treat Avenue	George Treat	Treat (1819–1907) was an early farmer in the Mission District, businessman, abolitionist, and horse racing enthusiast.
Turk Street	Frank Turk	
Ulloa Street	Antonio de Ulloa	
Union Square		So named because it was used for rallies in support of the Union Army during the American Civil War.
Valencia Street	Candelario Valencia	Owner of the Rancho Acalanes which is now Lafayette, California.
Vallejo Street	Mariano Guadalupe Vallejo	
Van Ness Avenue	James Van Ness	
Via Ferlinghetti	Lawrence Ferlinghetti	Formerly Price Row, renamed in 1994.
Vicente Street	Vicente Yáñez Pinzón	
Vicksburg Street	Siege of Vicksburg	
Waller Street	Mrs. R.H. Waller	Waller managed the San Francisco Protestant Orphan Asylum on Haight Street near Market Street.
Washington Street	George Washington	
Wawona Street	Wawona, California	
Webb Street	Stephen Palfrey Webb	
Webster Street	Daniel Webster	
Winfield Street	Winfield Scott	Originally called Chapultepec Street.
Woodward Street	Robert B. Woodward	Woodward was proprietor of Woodward's Gardens.
Yerba Buena Gardens		Yerba buena ("good herb" in Spanish) was the name the Spanish missionaries gave to the local wild mint species Clinopodium douglasii. It was the name of the anchorage at Yerba Buena Cove and San Francisco's first civilian town, which grew into the modern city, located at the cove.
Yorba Street	José Antonio Yorba	
Zampa Lane	Al Zampa	

== See also ==
- List of hills in San Francisco
- List of streets in San Francisco
