= List of streets in San Francisco =

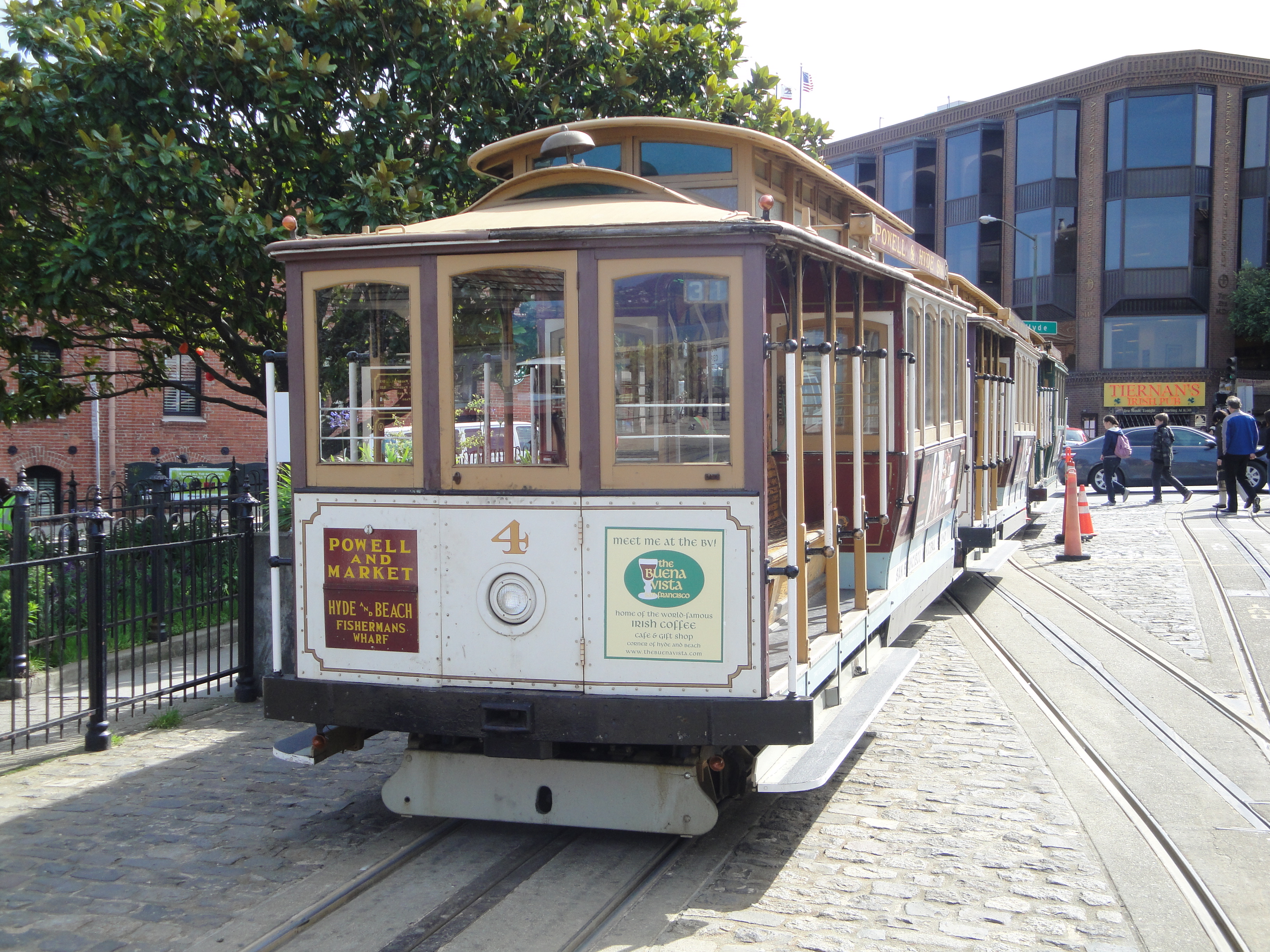
List of streets in San Francisco

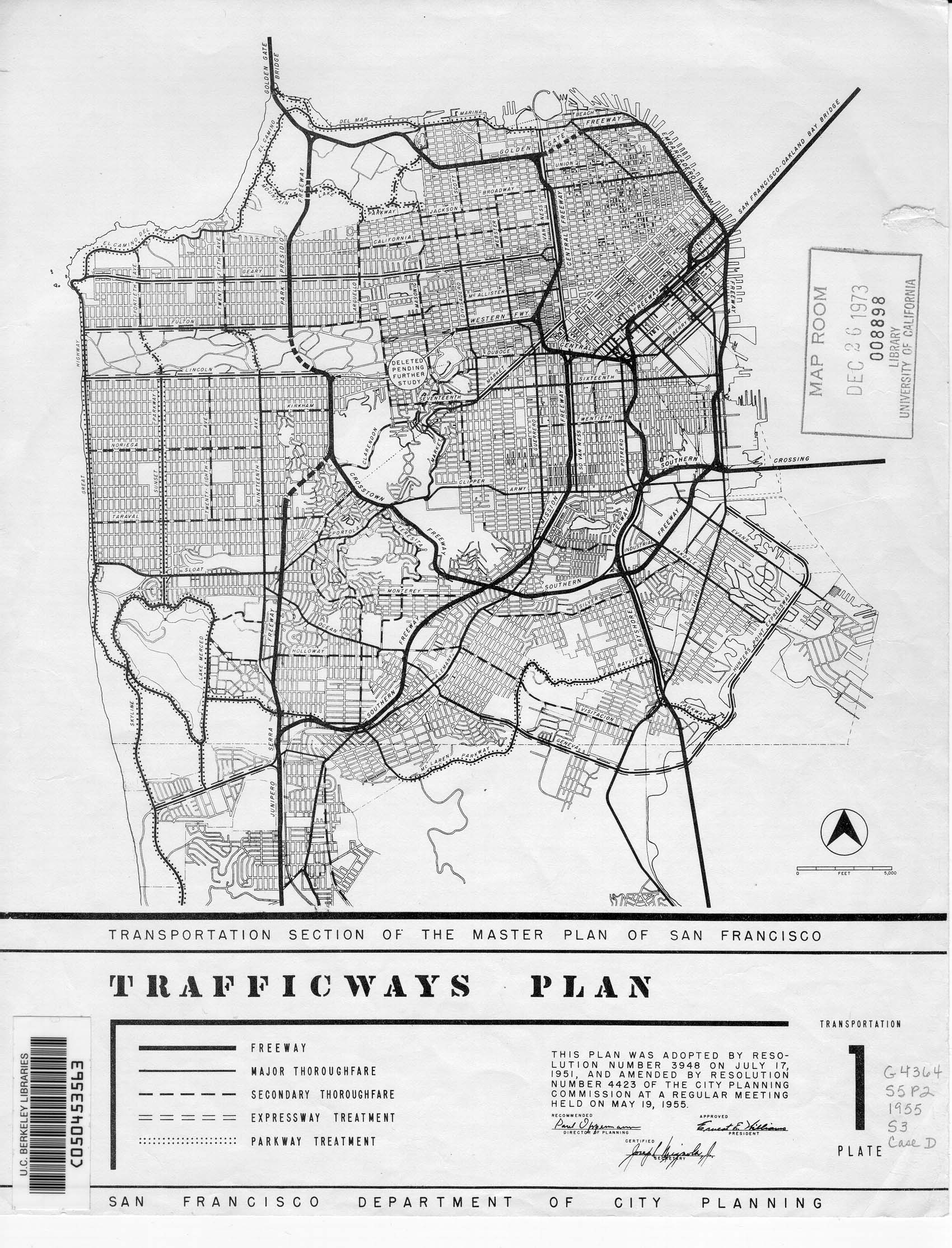

This is a list of streets in San Francisco, California. They are grouped by type: arterial thoroughfares, commercial corridors, and other streets.

== Arterial thoroughfares ==
- 19th Avenue bisects the western part of the city, extending from Interstate 280 to Golden Gate Park on the way to the Golden Gate Bridge. The section from Interstate 280 to Golden Gate Park is also designated as California State Route 1.
- California Street
- Fell Street runs from near the terminus of the Central Freeway towards Golden Gate Park, turning into Lincoln Way.
- Geary Boulevard splits into Geary Street and O'Farrell Street east of Gough Street.
- Fulton Street runs along the northern length of Golden Gate Park
- Lincoln Way runs along the southern length of Golden Gate Park
- Lombard Street acts as US 101 between Richardson and Van Ness Avenues
- Market Street
- Park Presidio Boulevard runs through the Richmond District between 14th and Funston Avenues, connecting Golden Gate Park to the Presidio of San Francisco, and is itself a park. This route also carries California State Route 1.
- Portola Drive is the extension of Market Street into the south and western portion of San Francisco
- San Jose Avenue, a major commuter road, brings thousands of cars into San Francisco every day (aka the Bernal Cut)
- Van Ness Avenue acts as US 101 through the heart of San Francisco from the Central Freeway towards the northern section of the city and to the Golden Gate Bridge.

== Commercial corridors ==
- 24th Street: Between Church and Castro Street, it forms the principal commercial corridor of Noe Valley. Between Mission Street and Potrero Avenue, it forms a commercial corridor in the Mission District. There is a BART station at Mission Street and 24th Street.
- Columbus Avenue runs diagonal to the prevailing grid pattern and forms the principal commercial corridor through North Beach
- Fillmore Street forms the principal commercial corridor of both Pacific Heights and the Fillmore
- Grant Avenue
- Kearny Street
- Mission Street
- Polk Street
- Stockton Street
- Union Street is the principal commercial corridor of Cow Hollow
- Valencia Street

== Other streets ==
- Third Street
- 22nd Street
- 49-Mile Scenic Drive
- Alemany Boulevard
- Broadway
- Castro Street
- Cesar Chavez Street (formerly Army Street)
- Divisadero Street
- Don Chee Way
- The Embarcadero
- Filbert Street
- Golden Gate Avenue
- Great Highway
- Haight Street, namesake of the Haight-Ashbury district
- Hayes Street
- Howard Street
- Junipero Serra Boulevard
- John F. Kennedy Drive is the main East-West arterial for Golden Gate Park, beginning where it continues on from Fell Street running westward to the Great Highway.
- Lombard Street, with 8 hairpin turns
- Montgomery Street
- New Montgomery Street
- Octavia Boulevard
- Skyline Boulevard
- Vermont Street, with 7 hairpin turns – while the honor of "crookedest street in the world" often goes to a block of Lombard Street, a section of this street is more sinuous

== Alleyways ==
- Balmy Alley
- Belden Place
- Clarion Alley
- Jack Kerouac Alley
- Macondray Lane
- Maiden Lane
- Ross Alley

== See also ==
- List of San Francisco placename etymologies
- Interstate 80 in California
