= Hayes Valley, San Francisco =

Hayes Valley
- Neighborhood
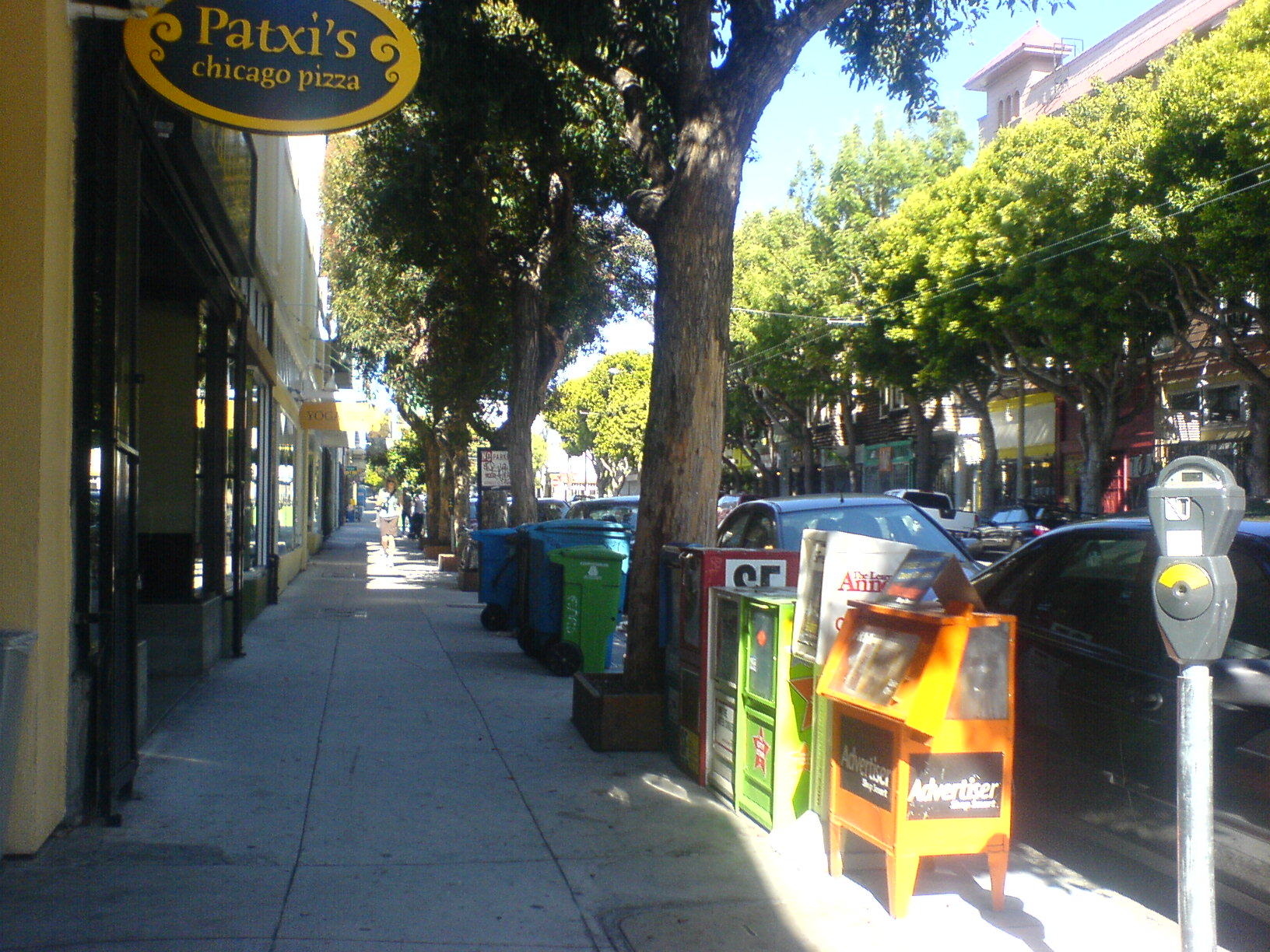
- Looking west along Hayes Street from Octavia Boulevard.

- Location within Central San Francisco
- Coordinates: 37.7764°N 122.4262°W
- Country: United States
- State: California
- City-county: San Francisco

Government
  - Supervisors: Bilal Mahmood
  - Assemblymember: Matt Haney (D)
  - State senator: Scott Wiener (D)
  - U. S. rep.: Nancy Pelosi (D)

Area
  - Total: 0.180 sq mi (0.47 km^{2})
  - Land: 0.180 sq mi (0.47 km^{2})

Population (2008)
  - Total: 5,672
  - Density: 31,476/sq mi (12,153/km^{2})
- Time zone: UTC-8 (Pacific)
  - Summer (DST): UTC-7 (PDT)
- ZIP codes: 94102, 94117
- Area codes: 415/628

Hayes Valley is a neighborhood in the Western Addition district of San Francisco, California. It is located between the historical districts of Alamo Square and the Civic Center. Victorian, Queen Anne, and Edwardian townhouses are mixed with high-end boutiques, restaurants, and public housing complexes. The neighborhood gets its name from Hayes Street, which was named for Thomas Hayes, San Francisco's county clerk from 1853 to 1856 who also started the first Market Street Railway franchise.

== Location ==
Although its boundaries are ill-defined, Hayes Valley is generally considered to be the area north and south of Hayes Street between Webster (near Alamo Square) and Franklin (near the Civic Center) streets. Hayes Valley's commercial center comprises the section of Hayes Street running from approximately Laguna Street in the west to Franklin Street in the east, with extensions on perpendicular Gough and Laguna streets.

As of April 2012, after changes to the district boundaries used by the Board of Supervisors, the Hayes Valley Neighborhood Association considers the neighborhood as a whole to be bound by Webster Street in the west, Van Ness Avenue in the east, Fulton Street in the north, and Hermann Street and Market Street in the south, with extensions as far west as Fillmore, between Haight Street and Hermann Street, as far north as McAllister Street, between Franklin Street and Van Ness Avenue, and as far south as Market Street, between Buchanan Street and Laguna Street. (This definition overlaps considerably with the Lower Haight.)

The San Francisco Association of Realtors considers the Hayes Valley to be extending from McAllister Street in the north, to Market Street and Duboce Avenue in the south, Franklin Street in the east, and Webster Street (north of Fell Street) and Divisadero Street (south of Fell Street) forming the western boundaries. (This definition includes the entire Lower Haight within Hayes Valley.)

Adjacent neighborhoods include the Lower Haight and small parts of the Duboce Triangle and SoMa in the south, Alamo Square in the west, Civic Center in the east, and the Fillmore District to the north.

== Public transportation ==
Hayes Valley is served by several San Francisco Municipal Railway (MUNI) buses, including the #21, which runs through Hayes Valley on its east-west route between Golden Gate Park and the Ferry Building, the #5 (also east-west), the #22 (runs north-south along Fillmore Street) and the #6 and #7, which both run east-west along Haight. Hayes Valley shares the Van Ness Avenue Muni LRV car subway station with Civic Center, Mid-Market, and SoMa West. Here, residents can take J, K, M, L, N, and T cars throughout San Francisco.

== History ==
=== Pre-Colonization Until 19th Century ===
Native people in many small bands, now referred to collectively as the Ohlone tribe, lived in San Francisco part of the year, gathering food in the Mission Creek area, which included seasonal Hayes Creek, and other parts of today's city. Hayes Valley would have been thickly covered with wildflowers every spring. When it was running in the winter, Hayes Creek cut diagonally through the current Hayes Valley. It is now underground year-round.

In 1776, local people came under the control of the Spanish empire with the Juan Bautista de Anza expedition, which established Mission San Francisco de Asís south of Hayes Valley.

=== 19th century ===
After the 1849 California Gold Rush, Italian emigrants from around Genoa developed produce farms on the sandy soil of the Hayes Valley neighborhood.

The Western Addition was developed in the 1850s to expand the city to the west of Van Ness Avenue. Michael Hayes, who, in 1856, was on the committee which named the streets of this development, may have been instrumental in naming Hayes Street for his brother, Thomas, a large landholder in the neighborhood who was then serving as county clerk. Hayes Valley was built out with many grand Victorian residences, as well as the smaller residences built to house the craftspeople at work on the mansions. Primary streets with big houses were named for influential local citizens (Hayes and Gough) and families (McAllister), while streets with the smaller houses carry botanical names such as Lily, Ivy, Linden, and Hickory.

=== 20th century ===
Hayes Valley south of McAllister Street was spared the fires that followed the 1906 San Francisco earthquake. It was a multi-ethnic neighborhood, becoming, with the blossoming of the Fillmore district after World War II, an African-American neighborhood. As recently as the mid-1980s, this neighborhood (and, indeed, the Western Addition in general) was considered one of the most dangerous places in the Bay Area.

=== 21st century ===
Since the turn of the century, Hayes Valley has transformed into a urban destination, blending local businesses with long-standing community character. With housing policies and community advocacy, the neighborhood has maintained its diverse population while welcoming new residents and keeping amenities. The area now features a mix of historic architecture, housing developments, and small businesses.

=== Central Freeway ===
The elevated Central Freeway section of U.S. Route 101 was built in the neighborhood during the 1950s. Damaged during the 1989 Loma Prieta earthquake, it was closed afterward and eventually demolished after local activists campaigned for its removal. The destruction of the Central Freeway has spurred gentrification which has revitalized the neighborhood, and has made it one of the trendier sections of town with an eclectic mix of boutiques, high-end restaurants, and hip stores on Hayes Street.

In 2005, a section of the freeway was rebuilt to end at Market Street, with the new, tree-lined Octavia Boulevard running north through Hayes Valley along the previous path of Octavia Street to Fell Street. Between Fell and Hayes streets, a neighborhood green terminates the boulevard, providing seating, green space, a play structure for children, and a changing exhibition of public art. It is named Patricia's Green for Patricia Walkup, a local activist who volunteered her time for many years to fight neighborhood crime, and co-led the campaign to tear down the remaining part of the Central Freeway that ran through Hayes Valley.

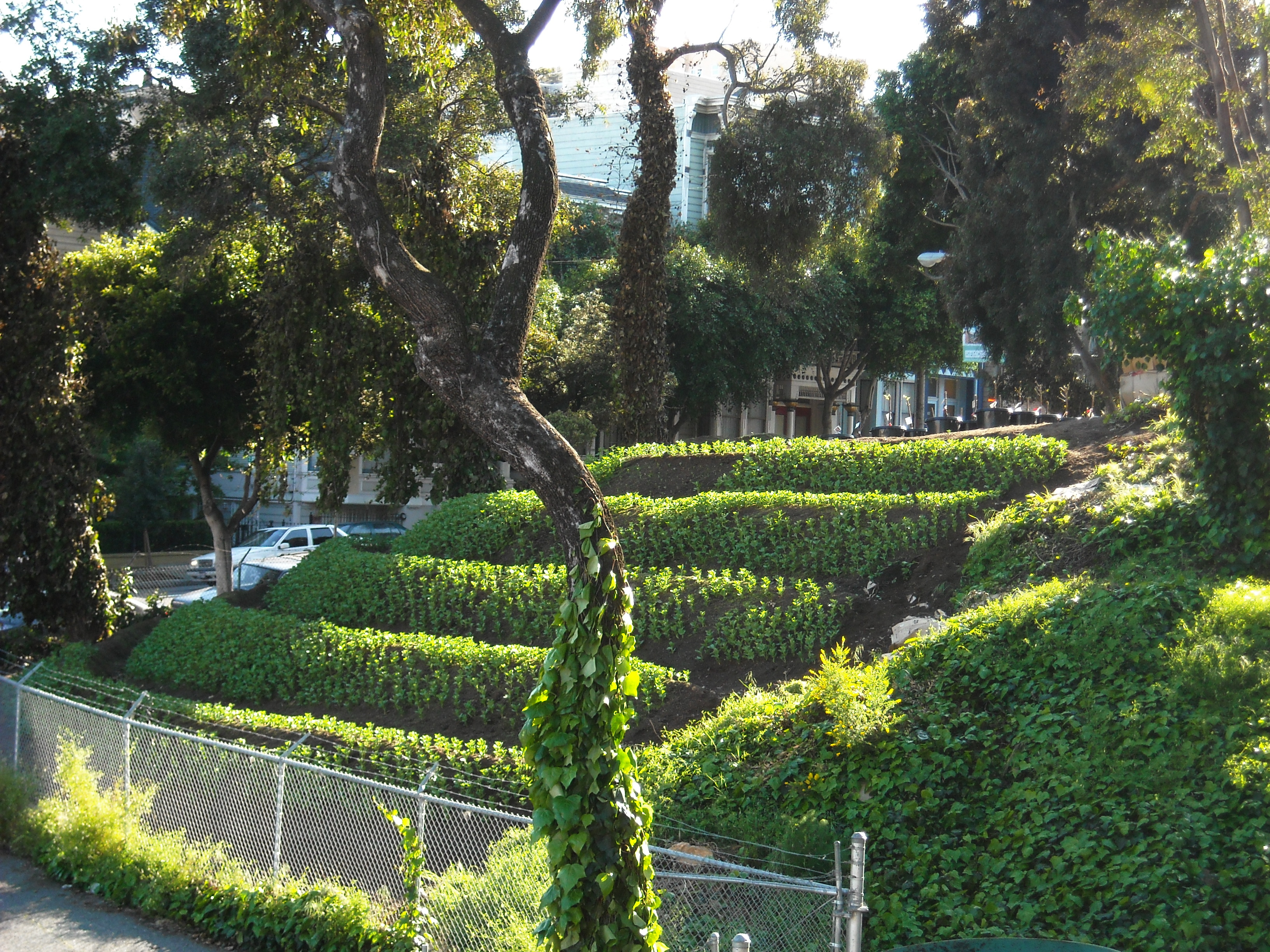
Fava beans grow at Hayes Valley Farm on the former Central Freeway

In 2010, the city-owned lots between Fell and Oak, and Laguna and Octavia, where the previous Central Freeway on- and off-ramps for Highway 101 were situated, were transformed into Hayes Valley Farm, an education and research project with a focus on urban permaculture and activating the urban commons. The project was founded on an interim use agreement between Hayes Valley Farm, the San Francisco Parks Alliance, and the Mayor's Office of Economic and Workforce Development. Community volunteers had permission to use the 2.2-acre lot until the city moved forward with other development plans for the site.

In June 2012, the media reported that approval had been given for retail premises and housing to be built on the site. An Avalon apartment complex is currently under construction at the site.

== Culture ==
In early 2013, the SFJAZZ Center, a brand new jazz concert hall, opened in Hayes Valley. It is considered the "first free-standing building in the West built for jazz performance and education."

San Francisco Opera opened in 1923, and San Francisco Ballet opened in 1933.

=== Cerebral Valley ===
Cerebral Valley is a term referring to the concentration of generative AI-focused communities, startups, and "hacker houses" that emerged in Hayes Valley during the AI boom of the early 2020s. Events such as the Cerebral Valley AI Summit, hosted by Eric Newcomer and the voice-AI startup Volley, have since taken place in the neighborhood.

According to the Washington Post, investor Amber Yang of Bloomberg Beta popularized the term "Cerebral Valley" in January 2023 to refer to the concentration of AI-focused communities and "hacker houses" in the neighborhood.

Group hacker houses focused on artificial intelligence grew in popularity in the early 2020s due to layoffs in Big Tech, a return to in-person events after the COVID-19 pandemic, and lower barriers to entry to AI innovation. The Washington Post credited the rise in events and houses around AI as being part of the revival of the San Francisco tech scene. On the app Partiful, event listings increasingly advertised their locations as "Cerebral Valley." By June 2023, the New York Times described Cerebral Valley as the center of the AI scene. Garry Tan of accelerator Y Combinator stated in April 2023 that Hayes Valley had become Cerebral Valley that year.

Many of the hacker houses in Cerebral Valley are based out of historic Victorian homes near Alamo Square. According to the San Francisco Standard, the hacker houses and associated "grind culture" are a return to the roots of Silicon Valley that led to the growth of companies such as Facebook in the early 2000s.

Notable hacker houses in Cerebral Valley include AGI House and Genesis House, which was founded in March 2021.

== Notable residents ==
- George W.C. Baker, Los Angeles City Council member, 1931–1935, attended Hayes Valley Grammar School

== Notable buildings and structures ==
- Charles Dietle House
- Ida B. Wells Continuation High School
- International High School of San Francisco
- San Francisco Zen Center
- SFJAZZ Center
- Smuggler's Cove
