= Freeway removal =

Replacement of motorways with pedestrian-friendly and urbanist land uses

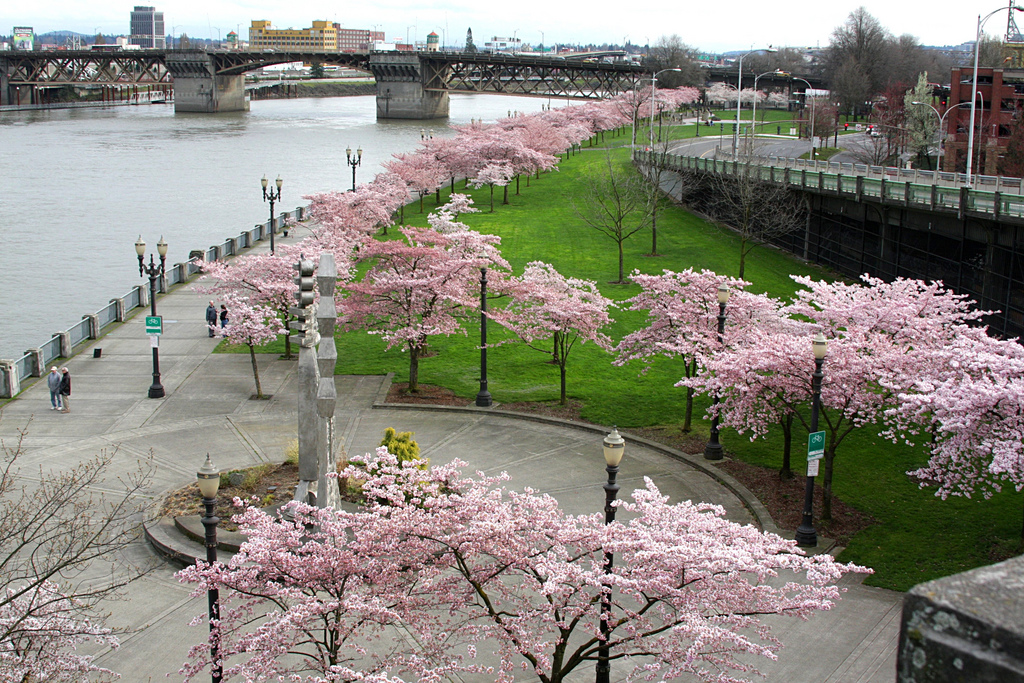
Cherry blossom in the Tom McCall Waterfront Park, created with the removal of the Harbor Drive in Portland, Oregon.

Freeway removal is a public policy of urban planning to demolish freeways and create mixed-use urban areas, parks, residential, commercial, or other land uses. Such highway removal is often part of a policy to promote smart growth, transit-oriented development, and pedestrian- and bicycle-friendly cities. In addition to outright removals, some freeways are reconstituted as boulevards, rebuilt below grade via tunnelling or caps and stitches, or are relocated through less densely-developed areas.

== Background ==
Cheonggyecheon in Seoul, South Korea was formerly the route for a major elevated highway; It was completed in 1976 and removed in 2005.

Freeway removals most often occur in cities where highways were built through dense neighborhoods - a practice common in the 20th century, particularly in U.S. cities following the 1956 enactment of the National Interstate and Defense Highways Act. These highways often created blight that minimized use of land space and reduced the quality of life for city residents. In the United States, the routes for interstate highways were often built through minority neighborhoods in urban centers, which often led to increasing racial segregation by creating physical barriers between neighborhoods.

Beginning in the late 20th century, as many highways reached the end of their lifespans, urban planners and activists began proposing demolishing or transforming highways in lieu of repairing them in an effort to alleviate the symptoms of displacement and lack of neighborhood connectivity. In many cases, there are political battles between citizens' groups who are proponents of freeway removal proposals and suburban drivers that want to keep the freeways.

In early 2021, U.S. Senator Chuck Schumer proposed legislation that would offer cities federal money to remove urban highways. The pilot program includes $10 billion to cover the inspection of existing infrastructure and possibly cover costs involved in removal and redevelopment planning.

== Political influence and planning ==
Removing freeways is a product of a decision made that was influenced by political stances, given conditions of the roads, and plans for urban development. In three cases of freeway removal studies by Napolitan and Zegras, they found that two of the three cases were accepted for removal given the presence of multiple aspects. Cases where removal was granted showed an increase in the number of concerns about structural safety of the freeway, what opportunities existed to develop the infrastructure instead of removing it, and the political leadership in place and their opinions on how to benefit their community. Conflicting opinions on the best way to use city roadways is a barrier to removing freeways and halts the process of planning better environments.

The policies enacted on transportation often refrain action on removing freeways. Sources of federal investment through the twentieth century prompted cities to develop systems of transportation that gave way to numerous freeway projects. Freeways had notoriously played a part in dividing cities and neighborhoods, causing a lack of community. Therefore, to increase and revitalize these urban areas, Kraft-Klehm argue that policies on national transportation should encourage freeway removal to reconnect communities. Attitudes on transportation have since shifted, and people are pushing for a community-first approach to the development as opposed to an automobile-first approach. Freeway removal projects receive varying political influence and planning that challenge ideas of overall project cost, concerns on traffic during the project, and access to the city region. Given that no two cities will produce the same results of a removal project, there are multiple appropriate approaches to successfully completing a project without forcing much displacement.

== Community and transportation effects ==
Notably, removal can heavily change patterns of transportation by limiting road access, changing traffic patterns, and adding excessive amounts of time to what would be a normal commute. Removing highways means people will be commuting through normal roadways and side streets. Being forced to enter cities and areas via this method will allow people a chance to reconsider their mode of travel and likely cause them to switch to another method. A typical sight within removal projects, as explained by Khalaj et al., is the addition of infrastructure built for pedestrians, cyclists, and public transportation. These additions can vary based on what may already be built in a city, such as the existing network of roadways, the transit choices available to citizens, and what specific infrastructure is being planned. Evidently, each city that entertains a freeway removal project must assess the current state of their community to put the benefits of the communities first.

Removing freeways gives communities the chance to reconnect and establish new relationships with more people nearby. The 1989 Loma Prieta earthquake demolished parts of San Francisco, forcing the city to remove the Embarcadero Freeway. Investigating the process and act of removal, Cervero found the city benefited from reconnecting the downtown sector with the waterfront as people were given improved pedestrian facilities and access to transit. Furthermore, replacement of the Central Freeway with Octavia Boulevard essentially opened up the city, allowing and increasing pedestrian access to public spaces. Freeway removal has the ability to reshape the community and change the way people choose to get around areas.

== Techniques ==
=== Freeway-to-boulevard conversion ===
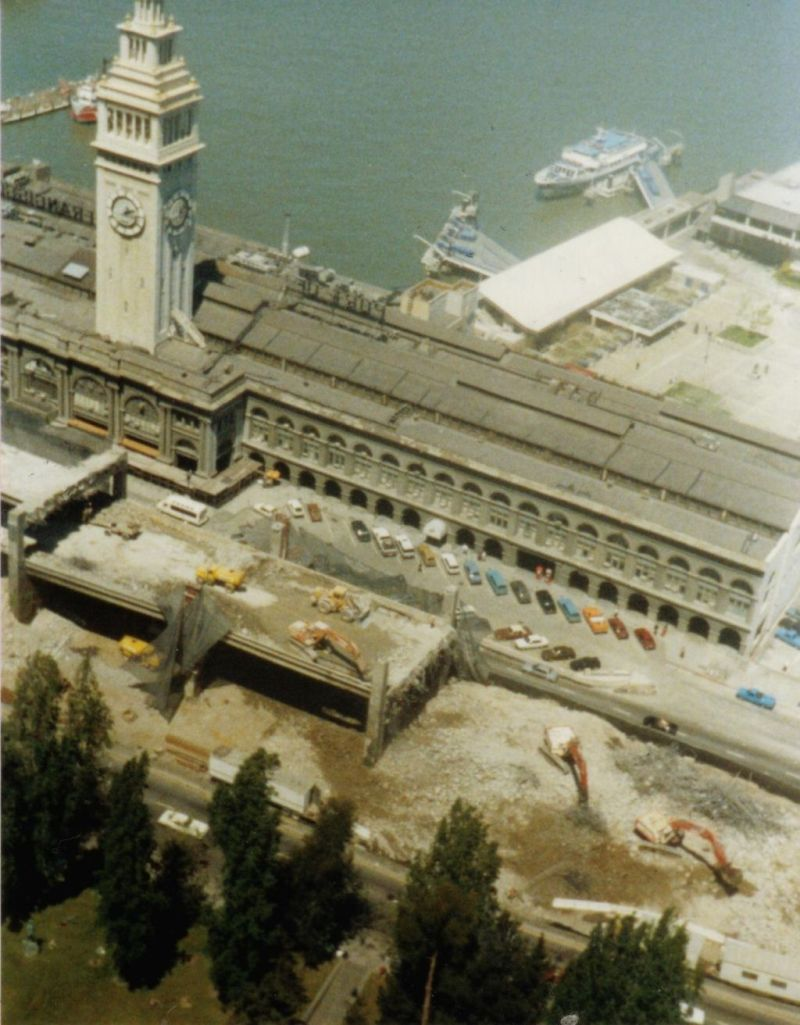
Section of the Embarcadero Freeway in San Francisco, California during demolition (May 1991)

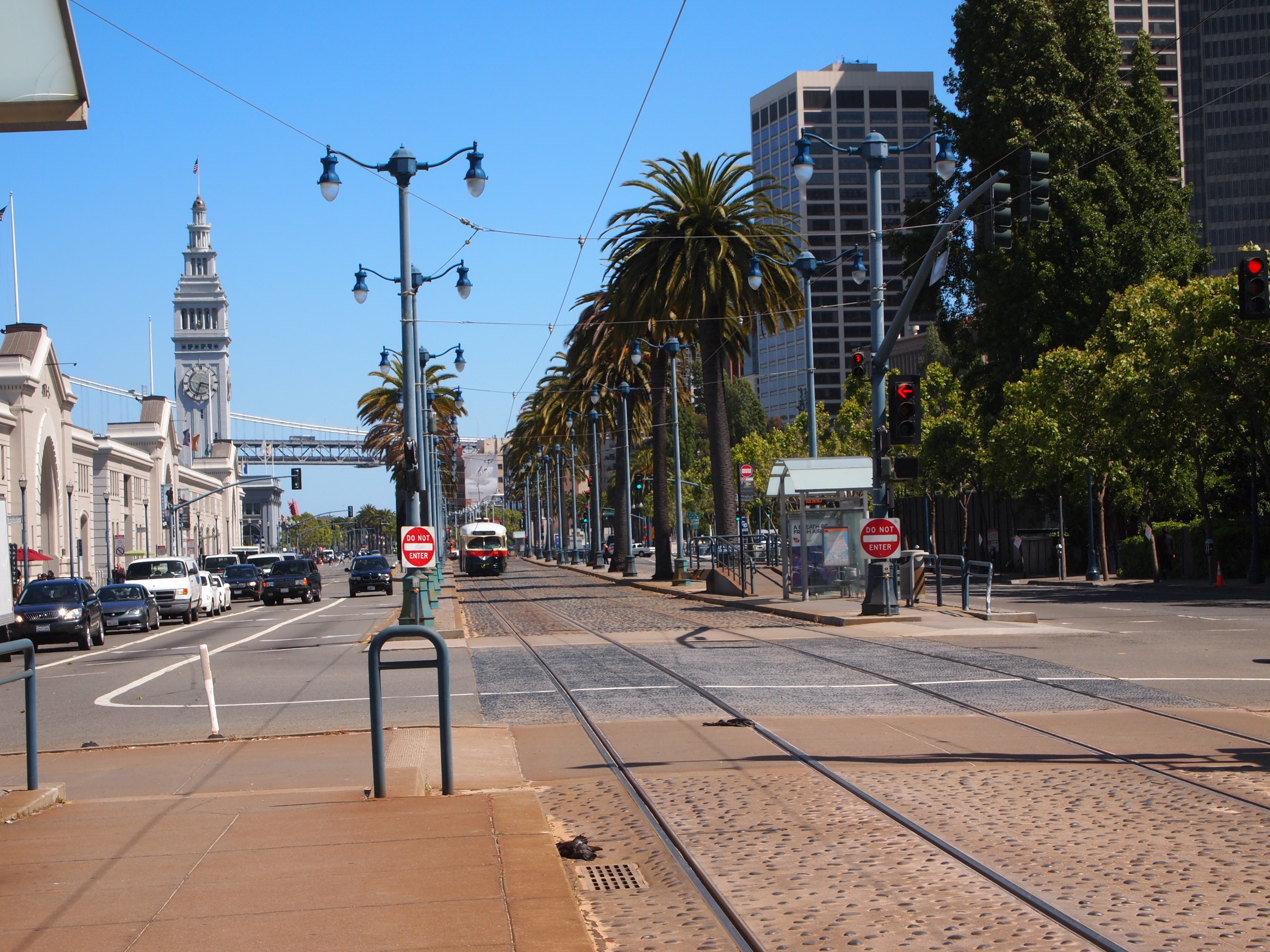
The Embarcadero following the freeway removal (2011)

A freeway-to-boulevard conversion involves demolishing a controlled-access highway with an at-grade boulevard. Land formerly devoted to highway lanes and exit ramps is often repurposed into wide sidewalks, bike lanes, green space, or sold for urban development.

One of the earliest examples of a freeway-to-boulevard conversion was the transformation of the West Side Elevated Highway into an urban boulevard in New York City. In 1971, the Urban Development Corporation proposed replacing the aging elevated highway with a new interstate highway in Manhattan. After fierce local opposition, New York City officially gave up on the proposed interstate project in 1985, and allocated 60 percent of its interstate highway funds to mass transit and setting aside $811 million for the "West Side Highway Replacement Project". In 1987, the commission unanimously agreed to build the highway as a six-lane urban boulevard with a parkway-style median and decorative lightposts, along with a 60 acres (24 ha) $100 million park on the highway's western periphery.

Another early freeway-to-boulevard conversion involved San Francisco's double-decked Embarcadero Freeway and Central Freeway, which were damaged during the Loma Prieta earthquake in 1989. The Central Freeway was replaced by the multi-modal, landscaped surface-level Octavia Boulevard, and the Embarcadero Freeway was replaced by a boulevard with streetcar and light rail operations in the median, flanked by the restored Beaux-Arts style Ferry Building.

Other early freeway removal projects occurred in Portland, Oregon, and Milwaukee, Wisconsin, USA, that ultimately reduced traffic, spurred economic development, and allowed for the creation of new neighborhoods and commercial districts. The Harbor Drive Freeway in Portland was replaced by Tom McCall Waterfront Park, while the Park East Freeway in Milwaukee recovered prime land for development in the urban core. In Toronto, Ontario, Canada, the easternmost portion of the Gardiner Expressway, which was located between Don Road and Leslie Street, was demolished in 2000 and replaced with an at-grade urban boulevard with traffic lights, railroad crossings and a bike trail.

=== Underground relocation ===
In situations where removing an urban freeway is believed to exacerbate traffic problems within a city, urban planners may resort to relocating the freeway underground to reclaim the space previously occupied by the surface highway.

In Boston, Massachusetts, USA, the Central Artery (Interstate 93) ran through the center of the city on an elevated green viaduct from its opening in the 1950s until 2005. The freeway divided historic neighborhoods and business districts in downtown Boston, and it was referred to as Boston's "other Green Monster." During the 1990s and early 2000s, a $15 billion project known as the Big Dig relocated the Central Artery into tunnels underneath downtown Boston; the old viaduct was demolished, and its path was reclaimed for a surface boulevard and park space.

The Alaskan Way Viaduct in Seattle, Washington, USA, was replaced with the tunnel that carries the SR-99 freeway underneath the city.

== Notable freeway removals ==
=== Completed ===
Highway	Location	Type	Year complete	Description
Alaskan Way Viaduct	Seattle, United States	Tunnel conversion	2019	Replaced with State Route 99 Tunnel
Autopista de Circunvalación M-30	Madrid, Spain	Tunnel conversion	2008	Partial removal: Southern segment relocated underground as part of the Madrid Río project
Bonaventure Expressway	Montreal, Canada	Boulevard conversion	2016	Elevated highway demolished and replaced with an urban boulevard and parkland
Ville-Marie Expressway and Décarie Road	Montreal, Canada		2018	Partial demolition only, some ramps reduced along the Turcot Interchange
Catharijnebaan	Utrecht, Netherlands	Removal	2010	Highway demolished and replaced with canal and green space
Central Artery	Boston, United States	Tunnel conversion	2003	Relocated underground as part of the Big Dig project
Central Freeway and Embarcadero Freeway	San Francisco, United States	Boulevard conversion	1993	Replaced by at-grade boulevards following 1989 Loma Prieta earthquake
Cheonggye Elevated Highway	Seoul, South Korea	Removal	2003	Replaced with artificial stream and green space
Cogswell Interchange (Harbour Drive)	Halifax, Canada	Boulevard conversion	2021	Freeway-to-boulevard conversion
Gardiner Expressway	Toronto, Canada		2001	Partial demolition; exit ramps replaced with parkland
Harbor Drive	Portland, United States	Removal	1974	Demolished and replaced with Tom McCall Waterfront Park
Innerbelt	Akron, United States		2017	Highway closed and redeveloped into parkland and urban development
Inner Loop	Rochester, United States		2014	Replaced with surface streets and urban development
Interstate 30	Fort Worth, United States		2001	Highway rerouted farther from downtown; elevated highway demolished and replaced with parkland and urban development
Interstate 70	Denver, United States	Tunnel conversion	2022	CDOT replaced a 1.8-mile (2.9 km) viaduct with a below-grade highway with a four-acre (1.6 ha) park being built over it
Interstate 170	Baltimore, United States		2010	Western stub removed for expansion of the West Baltimore station's parking lot and possible Red Line project
Interstate 195	Providence, United States		2011	Highway relocated as part of the Iway project; former highway right-of-way repurposed into urban development
NY 895 (Sheridan Expressway)	New York City, United States		2017	Freeway-to-boulevard conversion
Oak Street Connector	New Haven, United States		2013	Highway demolished and replaced with surface streets and urban development; portion of original highway repurposed as entrance to underground parking garage
Oklahoma City Crosstown Expressway	Oklahoma City, United States		2002	Partial highway-to-boulevard conversion
Park East Freeway	Milwaukee, United States		2002	Demolished and repurposed into urban development
Niagara Scenic Parkway	Niagara Falls, United States		2019	Highway removed and replaced with surface streets and waterfront parkland
Southeast Freeway	Washington, D.C., United States		2016	Partial freeway-to-boulevard conversion
Voie Georges-Pompidou	Paris, France		2016	Highway removed and replaced with public beaches and urban development
West Sacramento Freeway	Sacramento, United States		2014	Highway removed and replaced with surface streets and urban development
West Side Elevated Highway	New York City, United States		1977	Elevated highway demolished and replaced with urban boulevard
Zhongxiao Elevated Highway	Taipei, Taiwan		2016	Elevated highway repurposed from roadway into elevated park. Section next to the North Gate demolished to give an unimpeded view of the gate.
Riverfront Parkway (Chattanooga)	Chattanooga, United States		2004	Freeway-to-boulevard conversion
Cypress Street Viaduct	Oakland, United States		2005	Freeway-to-boulevard conversion, (NOTE: Destroyed due to Loma Prieta Earthquake in 1989.)
Bundesstraße 1	Dusseldorf, Germany		1993	Freeway was demolished and moved underground via the Rheinufer Tunnel.
Perimetral Highway	Rio De Janeiro, Brazil		2015	Freeway transformed into public space

=== Planned ===
Highway	Location	Description
Interstate 81	Syracuse, United States	Approved proposal to reroute I-81 traffic around Syracuse via Interstate 481 and downgrade the existing freeway to a business loop boulevard; the plan was halted by judges multiple times and faced strong local opposition, but the construction phase has begun since then
Interstate 375	Detroit, United States	Approved proposal to replace portion of freeway with at-grade boulevard; construction is planned for 2027 and 2028
Tokyo Expressway	Tokyo, Japan	Approved proposal to replace majority of expressway with an elevated park; construction is planned to begin in 2025
Interstate 229	St. Joseph, United States	Approved proposal to replace freeway with at-grade boulevard through downtown St. Joseph. Even though right of way funding for the project has been allocated for the fiscal year of 2027, no additional funding or timeline has been designated for design or construction.
Interstate 244	Tulsa, United States	Approved proposal to replace freeway with at-grade street
Massachusetts Route 28	Boston, United States	Freeway-to-boulevard conversion

=== Proposed ===
Highway	Location	Description
Claiborne Expressway	New Orleans, United States	Proposal to demolish highway (I-10) and replace with at-grade boulevard; the governments of Louisiana and New Orleans have countered with a proposal to improve the elevated freeway and the space beneath it as well as remove four ramps in Tremé instead due to the negative travel congestion impacts that would result from removing the expressway
Downtown Connector	Atlanta, United States	Proposal to rebuild highway underground beneath the city
Interstate 787 and South Mall Arterial	Albany, United States	Proposal to remove highway and replace with at-grade boulevards, surface streets, urban development, and riverfront green space; a draft report released in May 2019 did not recommend this change, but studies on the freeway's future continue
Interstate 345	Dallas, United States	Proposal to demolish highway and replace with an at-grade boulevard; this proposal was rejected by TxDOT due to negative traffic congestion impacts
Interstate 35	Austin, United States	Proposal to re-route I-35 traffic around Austin via State Highway 130 and replace existing highway with an at-grade boulevard through Austin; despite widespread opposition, TxDOT instead plans to rebuild and bury the freeway below-grade with some sections possibly covered with caps-and-stitches containing parkland
Interstate 35	Duluth, United States	Proposal to replace riverfront highway with at-grade boulevard and green space
Interstate 475	Flint, United States	Proposal to replace freeway with at-grade boulevard through downtown Flint
Metropolitan Expressway	Tokyo, Japan	Proposal to demolish viaduct through the city center
Whitehurst Freeway	Washington, D.C., United States	Proposal to demolish elevated highway; this proposal has been stopped several times
Interstate 794	Milwaukee, United States	Freeway-to-boulevard conversion
New Jersey Route 29	Trenton, United States	Proposal to replace freeway with at-grade boulevard to clear up land for developments on the Delaware River
California State Route 103	Long Beach, United States	Freeway-to-boulevard conversion
Interstate 70	Kansas City, United States	Freeway-to-boulevard conversion
Interstate 70	St. Louis, United States	Freeway-to-boulevard conversion
New York State Route 5	Buffalo, United States	Proposal to remove freeway in central Buffalo, however nothing has progressed
New York State Route 198	Buffalo, United States	Proposal to convert the freeway back into a parkway
Interstate 94	Minneapolis, United States	Freeway-to-boulevard conversion
Interstate 980	Oakland, United States	Freeway-to-boulevard conversion
Interstate 10 in California	Santa Monica, United States	Council direction to city staff to study removal of part of Santa Monica Freeway (potentially including parts of I-10 and CA-1) to be used as park space.

== See also ==
- Highway revolts
- Road diet
- Cyclability
- Transit mall – Urban street reserved for public transit, bicycles, and pedestrians
- Unused highway – Roads that were closed or never used
- Urban vitality
- 8664
