= California State Route 480 =

Former highway in California

State Route 480
- SR 480 highlighted in red; unbuilt portion highlighted in blue

Route information
- Maintained by Caltrans
- Status: Inactive after the Loma Prieta earthquake and later demolished in 1991
- Existed: 1968–1991

Embarcadero Freeway
- Southeast end: I-80 in San Francisco
- Northwest end: Broadway in San Francisco

Doyle Drive
- Southeast end: Marina Boulevard
- Major intersections: US 101 (Lombard Street) in San Francisco; SR 1 in San Francisco
- Northwest end: US 101 / SR 1 / Golden Gate Bridge

Location
- Country: United States
- State: California
- Counties: San Francisco

Highway system
- State highways in California; Interstate; US; State; Scenic; History; Pre‑1964; Unconstructed; Deleted; Freeways
← US 466	→ I-505

State Route 480 (SR 480) was a state highway in San Francisco, California, United States, consisting of the elevated double-decker Embarcadero Freeway (also known as the Embarcadero Skyway), the partly elevated Doyle Drive approach to the Golden Gate Bridge and the proposed and unbuilt section in between. The unbuilt section from Doyle Drive to Van Ness Avenue was to have been called the Golden Gate Freeway and the Embarcadero Freeway as originally planned would have extended from Van Ness along the north side of Bay Street and then along the Embarcadero to the San Francisco-Oakland Bay Bridge.

The Embarcadero Freeway, which had only been constructed from Broadway along the Embarcadero to the Bay Bridge, was demolished after the 1989 Loma Prieta earthquake, and Doyle Drive was then part of U.S. Route 101, until being replaced in 2015 by the Presidio Parkway. SR 480 was Interstate 480 (I-480), an auxiliary route of the Interstate Highway System, from 1955 to 1965, and signed as the state route from 1968 onwards. The entire route was removed in 1991, about two years after the earthquake.

== History ==
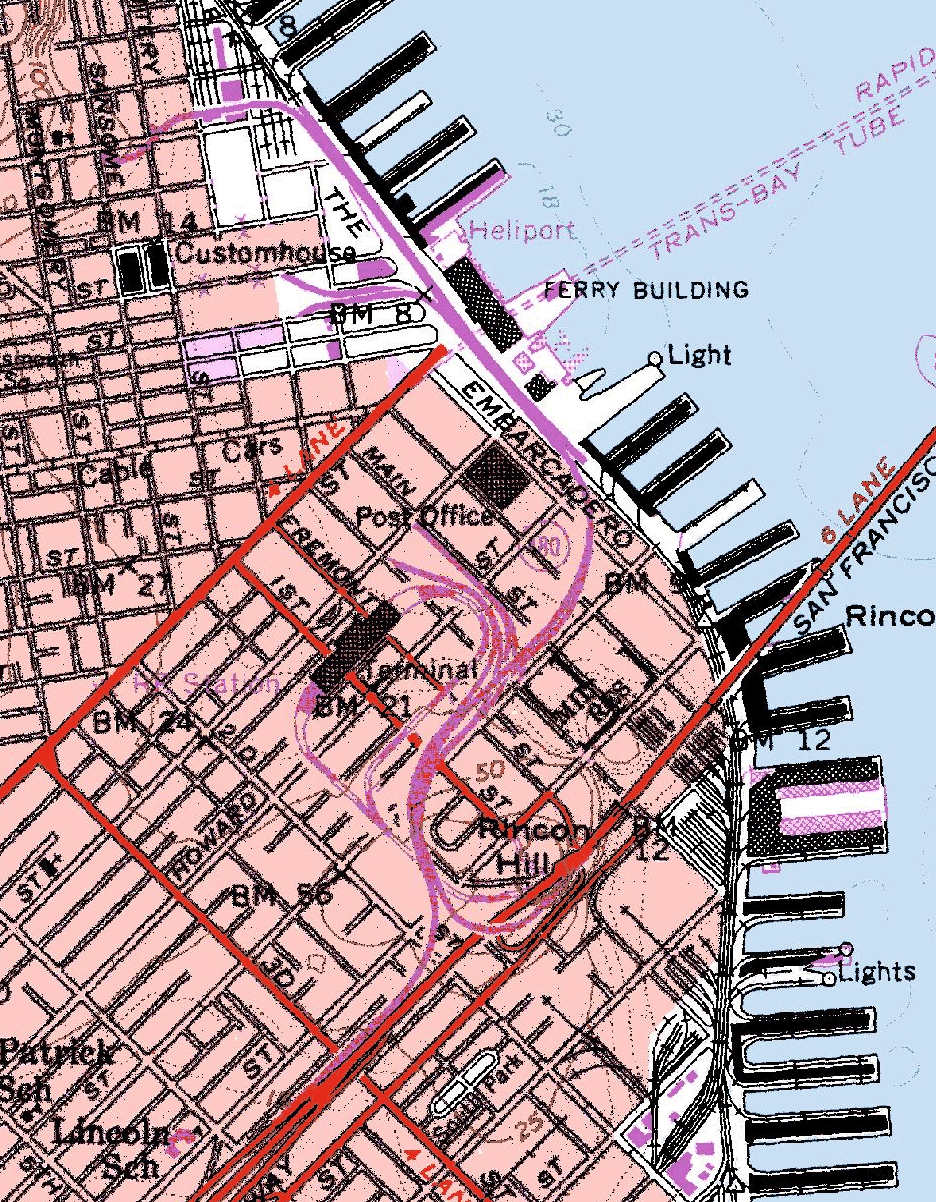
Map of the Embarcadero Freeway (purple)

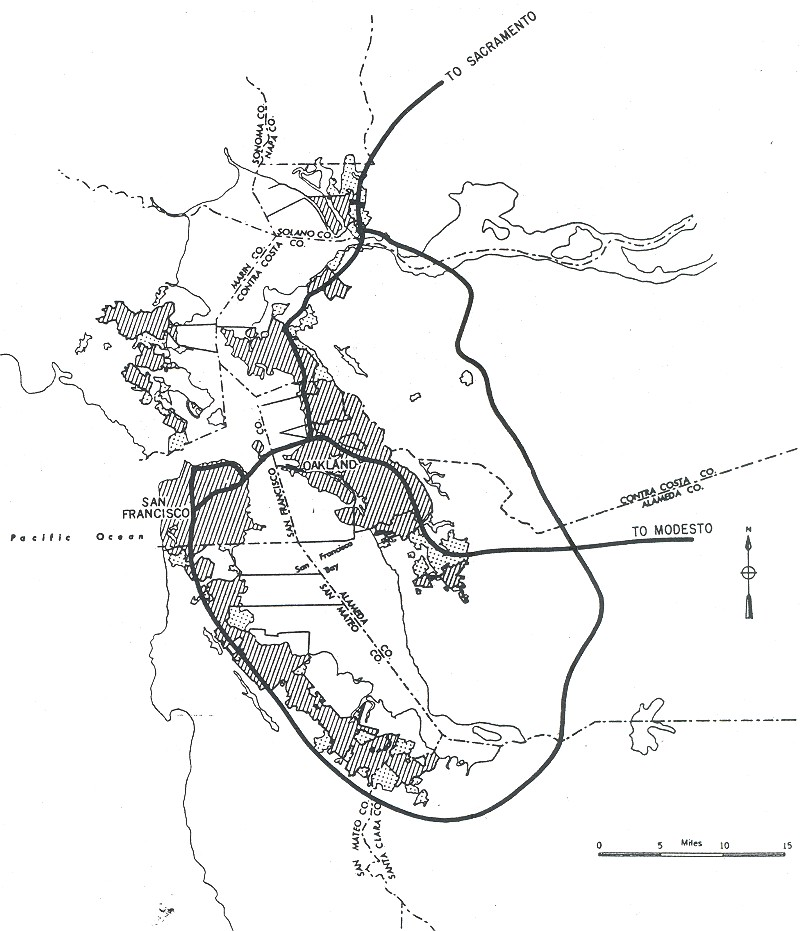
1955 map of the planned Interstates in the San Francisco Bay Area. I-480 would have run along the north side of the city, while I-280 would run south along the peninsula. I-80 was to have run past the east end of I-480 to end at I-280.

Interstate 480
- Location: San Francisco, California
- Existed: 1955–1968

Legislative Route 224 (LR 224) was defined in 1947 to connect U.S. Route 101 (US 101, pre-1964 Legislative Route 2) at the intersection of Lombard Street and Van Ness Avenue with US 40 and US 50 (pre-1964 Legislative Route 68) at the west end of the San Francisco–Oakland Bay Bridge (near the Transbay Terminal). Its alignment was roughly along Lombard Street and the Embarcadero.

LR 224, as well as Route 2 (US 101) from Route 224 west to the junction with SR 1 near the Golden Gate Bridge, was added to the Interstate Highway System on September 15, 1955. This included the 1936 Doyle Drive structure, an early freeway built to access the Golden Gate Bridge. After some discussion, the I-480 number was assigned on November 10, 1958. (I-280, as originally planned, ran south from the west end of I-480 along SR 1, through the MacArthur Tunnel and Golden Gate Park, to join its present alignment in Daly City.)

The original 1955 plan was to extend the Central Freeway as a double-decked structure between Van Ness Avenue and Polk Street north to Clay Street, then as a single-deck depressed freeway north to Broadway, where it would have tunneled under Russian Hill to connect with I-480.

=== Construction ===
Construction of the Embarcadero commenced in May 1955, starting with its connection to the Bay Bridge approach where the new Bayshore Freeway tie-in had just been completed.

The first section of the Embarcadero Freeway, from the Bay Bridge approach (I-80) near First Street north to Broadway, opened on February 5, 1959. The Clay Street and Washington Street ramps opened in 1965.

The freeway revolt caused the San Francisco Board of Supervisors to pass Resolution 45–59 in January 1959, opposing certain freeways, including the remainder of I-480. The freeway revolt continued after a new freeway plan was proposed in 1964, with a major protest on May 17, 1964–200,000 people rallied in Golden Gate Park against any more new freeways. Poet Kenneth Rexroth spoke at the rally (among others), and folk singer Malvina Reynolds sang (she was most famous for her song "Little Boxes", attacking urban sprawl, which she sang at the anti-freeway rally).

The proposed section as replanned in 1964 would have extended not from the Lombard Street exit of Doyle Drive along Lombard Street as originally planned in 1955, but from the Marina Boulevard exit off Doyle Drive, through the Marina Green and then along the north side of Fort Mason, then along the north side of Bay Street to the Embarcadero and south along the Embarcadero to connect with the Embarcadero Freeway. The section between the Golden Gate Bridge (including an upgraded Doyle Drive) and Van Ness Avenue would have been named the Golden Gate Freeway; the rest of the freeway east of Van Ness Avenue would have been the extended originally planned full length of the Embarcadero Freeway, originally planned to extend from Van Ness Avenue to the San Francisco–Oakland Bay Bridge—going east first down the north side of Bay Street, then going southeast curving around the base of Telegraph Hill and meeting at Broadway, the former end of the actually built section of the Embarcadero Freeway.

In the 1964 renumbering, Route 480 was legally designated for the full route of I-480, including the US 101 concurrency. The route was deleted from the Interstate Highway System in January 1968, and I-280 was rerouted north of Daly City at the same time. The short piece of former I-480 from the junction with new I-280 (previously SR 87) south to the Bay Bridge approach legally became part of I-280 (to allow I-280 to meet I-80), now named the Southern Embarcadero Freeway. These changes were made to the state highway system in 1968; the legislative designation of Route 480 was truncated only slightly, with the 5.47 miles (8.80 km) from I-280 to SR 1 remaining, though downgraded to SR 480; this extension of I-280 south (the Junipero Serra Freeway) is considered the southern terminus of Junipero Serra Boulevard.

A direct freeway connection from I-280 to either SR 480 or I-80 was never completed, leaving I-280 terminating in mid-air at Third Street. The Golden Gate Freeway also was never built to connect to Doyle Drive and the Golden Gate Bridge. This left ramp stubs on the Embarcadero Freeway where these connections would have been built near Howard Street and Broadway, respectively. These unbuilt segments caused Caltrans to sign the completed freeway segment from the Bay Bridge approach/I-80 near First Street to the Embarcadero as part of SR 480 instead of I-280, and Doyle Drive to be only signed as part of US 101.

== Demise and eventual demolition ==
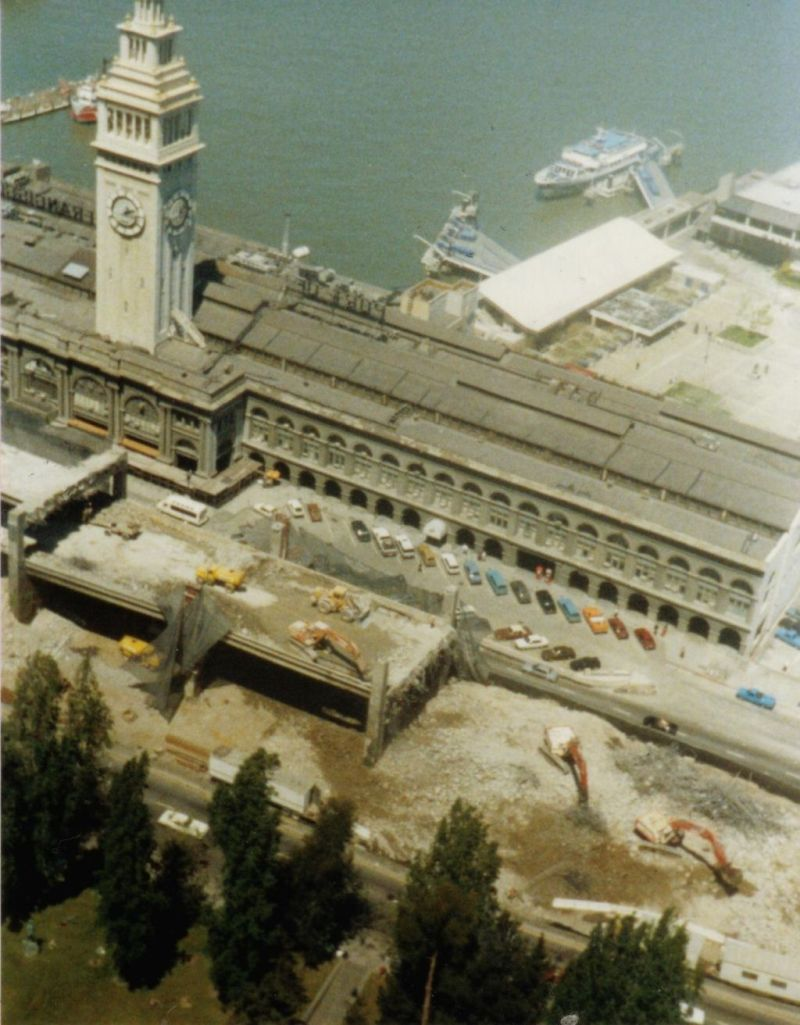
Section of the Embarcadero Freeway in front of the Ferry Building during demolition (May 1991)

In the 1980s, opposition to the Embarcadero Freeway resurfaced in proposals to demolish it. The proposal was put to the voters in 1986 and defeated, opposed in particular by influential Chinatown community organizer Rose Pak, who feared that Chinatown would suffer catastrophic consequences if it lost this fast crosstown connection.

The 1989 Loma Prieta earthquake significantly damaged the structure, causing it to be closed to traffic. The California Department of Transportation (Caltrans) planned to retain and retrofit the freeway. Various groups inside and outside the city supported the Caltrans plan, but there was a significant opinion within the city in favor of removing the freeway. Then-Mayor Art Agnos proposed demolishing the freeway in favor of a boulevard with an underpass at the Ferry Building to allow for a large plaza.

Opposition to demolishing the freeway mounted again, with over 20,000 signatures gathered in an attempt to require another city vote. Prior to the earthquake, the Embarcadero Freeway carried approximately 70,000 vehicles daily in the vicinity of the Ferry Building. Another 40,000 vehicles per day used associated ramps at Main and Beale streets. The strongest opposition came from Chinatown, led again by Pak, along with other neighborhoods north of downtown. Merchants in Chinatown had suffered a dramatic decline in business in the months immediately following the earthquake and feared that if the freeway was not reopened they would not recover.

Agnos continued to negotiate with federal and state officials to win enough funding to make the demolition practical, arguing that the city would squander "the opportunity of a lifetime" if it allowed the freeway to remain. After months of debate, the Board of Supervisors narrowly voted in favor of demolition by a 6–5 margin. Demolition began on February 27, 1991. That year, Agnos was defeated for re-election as Pak and Chinatown withdrew their support for him.

Meanwhile, the state legislature deleted SR 480 from the state's Streets and Highways Code. The northwest section along Doyle Drive was transferred to US 101. The only piece of the Embarcadero Freeway to remain was the beginning of the ramp from the Bay Bridge to Fremont Street, including a short ramp stub that formerly carried traffic to the freeway. This part was rebuilt as part of the Bay Bridge retrofit project (I-280 was never finished to that interchange, and its northern terminus was reconfigured to its present-day King Street on/off ramps in 1997, though I-280's legislative definition still takes it to I-80). In 2003, Caltrans began work on a retrofitting project to replace the western approach to the Bay Bridge. This retrofitting was part of a larger, $6-billion project to upgrade the aging Bay Bridge to modern earthquake standards, which included replacing the entire eastern span. In late 2005, Caltrans began the demolition of the original western approach after traffic was routed onto a temporary bypass structure. The western approach to the Bay Bridge was completed in 2009; the entire project was completed in 2013. As a result of this retrofitting project, all old parts of the approach have been replaced, removing the last traces of the Embarcadero Freeway. The Doyle Drive Replacement Project, completed in stages between 2012 and 2015, then replaced the old Doyle Drive with an entirely new "Presidio Parkway" segment (still officially called Doyle Drive), and the intersection with Marina Boulevard was converted to a diamond interchange.

== Legacy ==
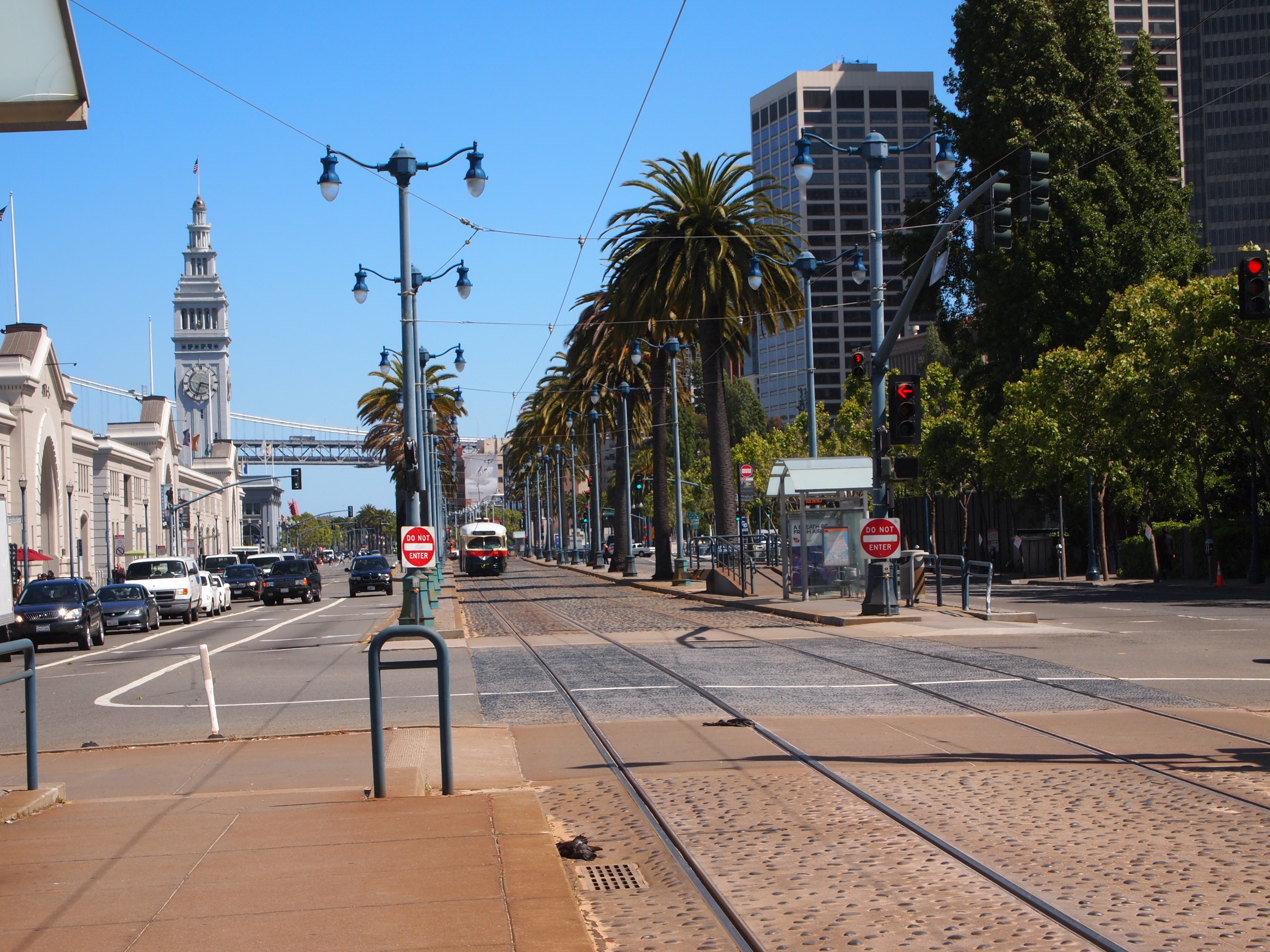
The Embarcadero in 2011

Along the waterfront, the former freeway was replaced with a wide, palm-lined boulevard with San Francisco Municipal Railway tracks in the median. The E Embarcadero and F Market & Wharves heritage streetcar lines, and N Judah and T Third Street Muni Metro light rail lines were extended to run along the Embarcadero. Sue Bierman Park replaced the Washington Street off-ramp just north of the Embarcadero Center, and Ferry Plaza was constructed in front of the San Francisco Ferry Building, which itself was remodeled into an upscale gourmet marketplace in 2003. Other new parks include Pier 14 Public Pier, Rincon Park near Folsom Street, and the Brannan Street Wharf. The former on-ramp at Broadway and Sansome streets was redeveloped into 75 low-income housing units.

Along the north side of Folsom Street between Essex and Spear streets, the former freeway right-of-way was transferred to the City of San Francisco and included in the Transbay Redevelopment Plan, which calls for the development of over 2,500 new homes, 3,000,000 square feet (280,000 m^{2}) of new office and commercial space, and 100,000 square feet (9,300 m^{2}) of retail. The demolition of the freeway and redevelopment of the Embarcadero has been cited by urban planners from jurisdictions around the world studying freeway removal projects, including Seattle's Alaskan Way Viaduct (demolished in 2020), Boston's Central Artery, and Toronto's Gardiner Expressway.

In a 2004 retrospective of the Loma Prieta earthquake, San Francisco Chronicle architecture critic John King wrote:

[The Embarcadero Freeway] cut off the downtown from the water that gave birth to it, and it left the iconic Ferry Building – a statuesque survivor of the 1906 earthquake – stranded behind a dark wall of car exhaust and noise. Oppressive does not begin to describe it... Take a walk today on the 2 1/2-mile [4.0 km] promenade between Fisherman's Wharf on the north and China Basin on the south, and it's hard to believe that an elevated freeway ever scarred the open air.

On June 16, 2006, the Port of San Francisco unveiled a monument at Pier 14 to Mayor Agnos honoring his vision, noting: "This pedestrian pier commemorates the achievement of Mayor Agnos in leaving our city better and stronger than he found it."

Community organizer Rose Pak, who had fought to preserve the Embarcadero Freeway, later lobbied for the Central Subway to be built to extend the Muni Metro's T Third Street Line into Chinatown. The San Francisco Chronicle in 2016 credited her for "almost single-handedly persuad[ing] the city to build" the Central Subway to compensate Chinatown for the loss of the freeway.

== Gallery ==
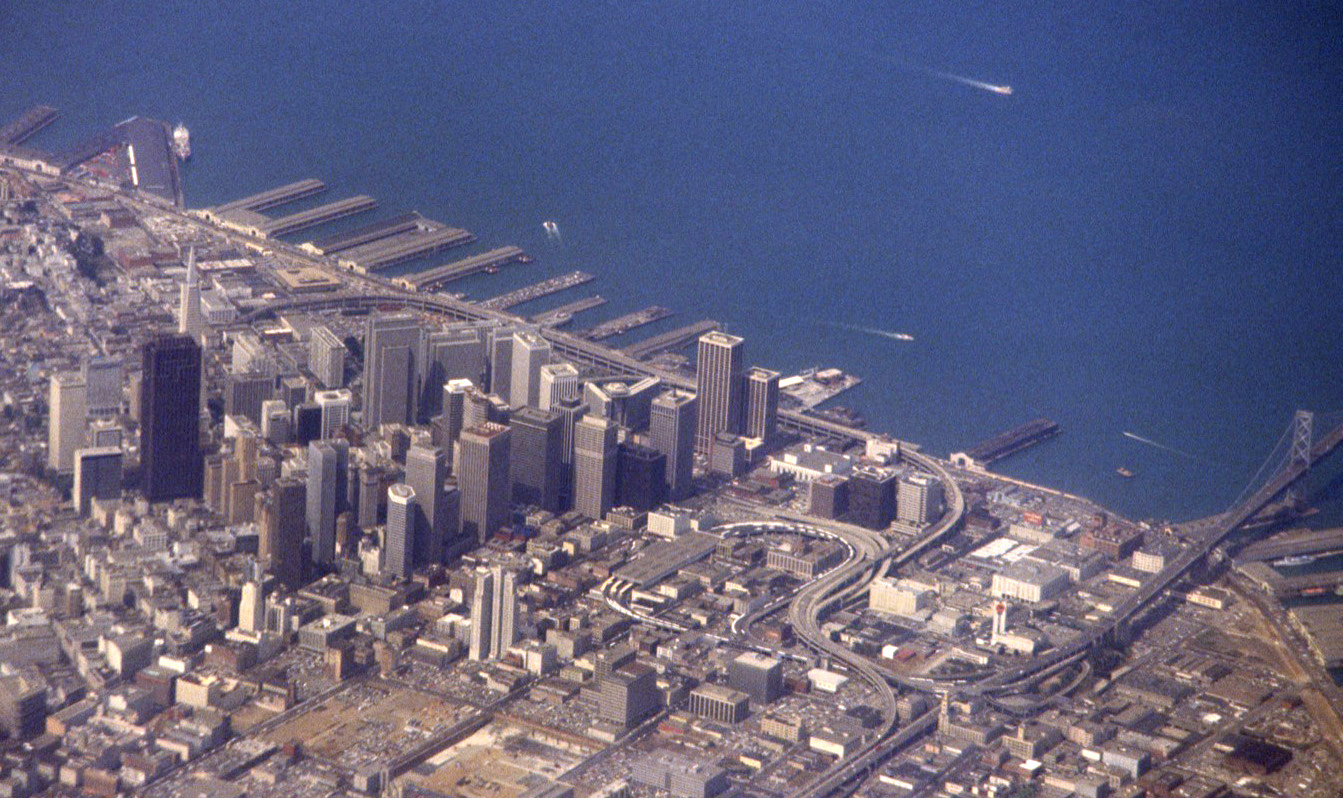
Embarcadero Structure in 1978

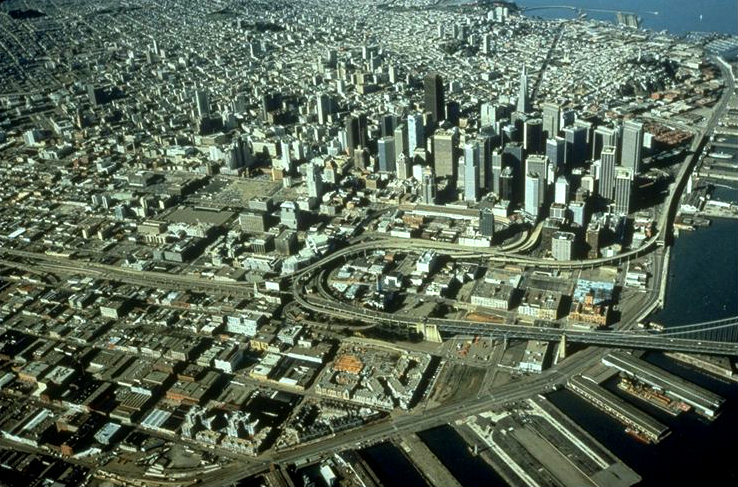
Ramps and interchanges between Bay Bridge, I-80, and the Embarcadero Freeway prior to the 1989 earthquake

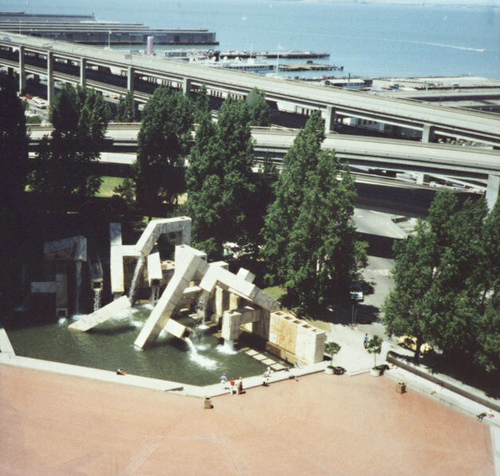
Embarcadero Freeway around 1988

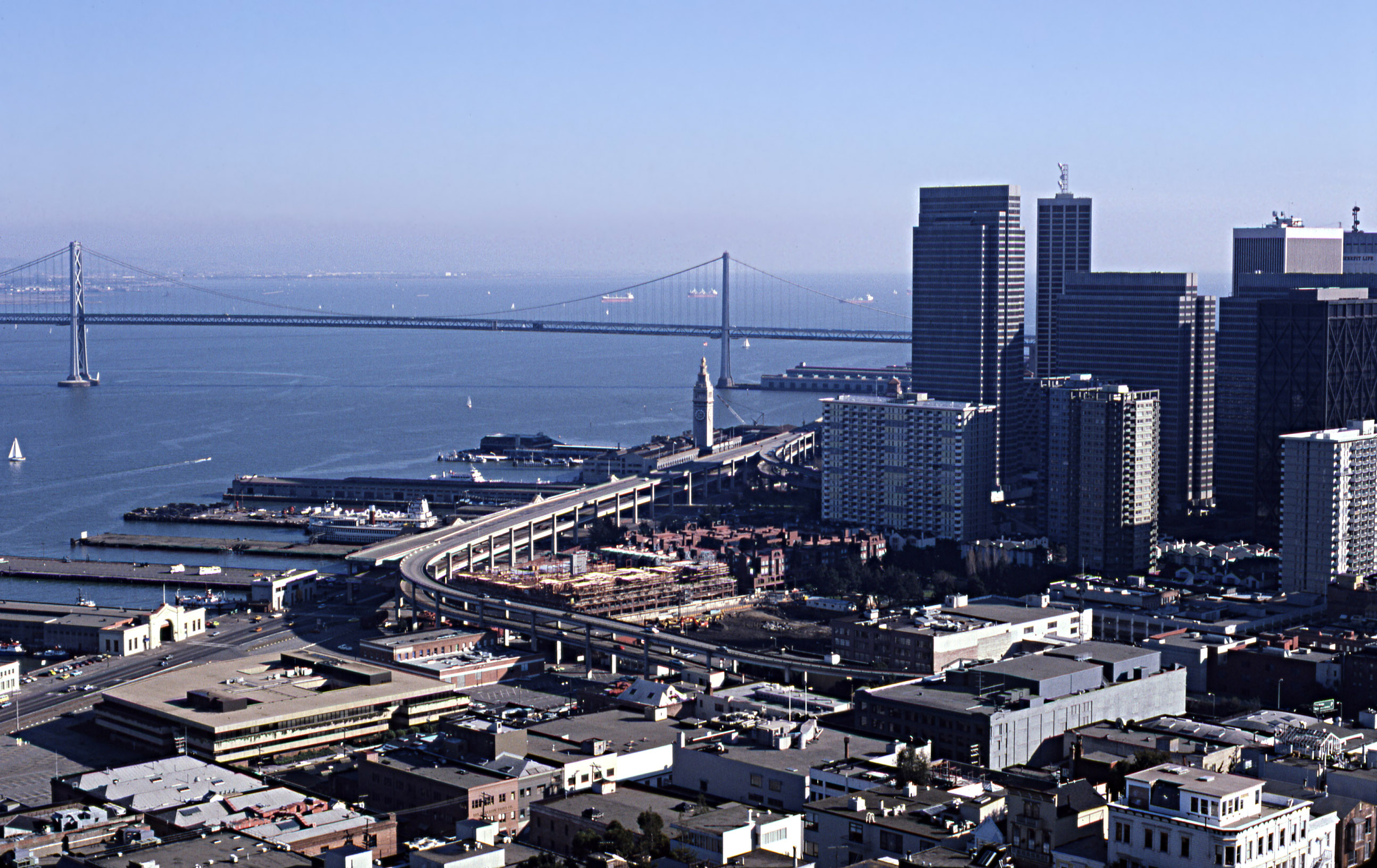
Embarcadero Freeway in February 1982

== Exit list ==
The following is an exit list of SR 480 prior to the Loma Prieta earthquake and subsequent demolition.

The entire route was in San Francisco.

mi	km	Destinations	Notes
		I-80 east (Bay Bridge) – Oakland	Southbound exit and northbound entrance
		Fremont Street	Northbound exit only from I-80 west
		San Francisco Transbay Terminal	Buses only from I-80 west; northbound exit and southbound entrance; former Key System ramps
		US 101 south (Bayshore Freeway via I-80 west) – San Jose	Southbound exit and northbound entrance
		Main Street	Northbound exit only
		Beale Street	Southbound entrance only
		Washington Street	Northbound exit only
		Clay Street	Southbound entrance only
		Broadway, Battery Street	Northbound exit only
		Broadway, Sansome Street	Southbound entrance only
Gap in route
		Marina Boulevard	Continuation beyond US 101
		US 101 south (Lombard Street)	Southern end of US 101 concurrency; southbound exit and northbound entrance
		SR 1 south (Park Presidio Boulevard)	Southern end of SR 1 concurrency
		US 101 / SR 1 north – Golden Gate Bridge	Northern end of US 101/SR 1 concurrency; continuation beyond the Golden Gate Bridge approach
1.000 mi = 1.609 km; 1.000 km = 0.621 mi

== See also ==
- Alaskan Way Viaduct, a former elevated freeway along the Seattle waterfront that was demolished and replaced by the two-mile State Route 99 Tunnel.
- Interstate 280 (California) – the only remaining similar freeway in the Bay Area.
- John F. Fitzgerald Expressway, a former elevated freeway in Boston (Interstate 93) that was rerouted into a 3.5-mile (5.6 km) tunnel.
- West Side Elevated Highway, a former elevated freeway along the West Side waterfront in Manhattan that was partially replaced with an at-grade boulevard.
