= Thomas Hayes (San Francisco landowner) =

American politician

Thomas Hayes (c. 1820 – June 24, 1868) was an Irish-born American land owner in the western addition to San Francisco in the 19th century. Hayes Valley in the western addition and Hayes Street are named after him. He was the original franchisee of the Market Street Railway and county clerk between 1853 and 1856. The franchise for what would become the Market Street Railway was granted in 1857. The line was the first horsecar line to open in San Francisco, opened on July 4, 1860, as the Market Street Railroad Company. The goal was to bring the land to market. The method would be a railway. Thomas Hayes, who owned a large tract in the Western Addition, now known as the "Hayes Valley" and the banking house of Pioche and Bayerque, who held Hayes's mortgage, ultimately joined with several large property owners in the Mission, to form a business alliance to build a rail line connecting the main part of San Francisco with the old Mission settlement, a distance of three miles.

Thomas Hayes came from Rosscarbery, County Cork, Ireland, and arrived in San Francisco in 1849. Hayes owned the land where the present day Civic Center buildings are located. In 1861, Tom Hayes constructed the first outdoor recreational park, Hayes Park.

In 1868, Hayes was elected as a delegate from San Francisco to the 1868 Democratic National Convention in New York City. En route to the convention, he died of pleurisy at sea on June 24, 1868, just days from arriving in New York aboard the SS. Santiago de Cuba. Hayes died a bachelor. In his will, he left a number of trusts for the benefit of his father and other relatives. The remainder was left to the children of his two brothers, John and Michael Hayes, and to his sister.

Funeral was held for him in New York on June 29, 1868, at St. Xavier's Church, 16th Street. His coffin was then moved to the Second Avenue cemetery vault, reportedly to await transport to San Francisco aboard the next steamer. His remains were shipped about a year later, but were temporarily interred at the Isthmus of Panama after his casket broke during the transport; they finally arrived in San Francisco on March 16, 1870. His San Francisco funeral occurred on March 27, 1870.
