= Octavia Boulevard =

Major road in San Francisco

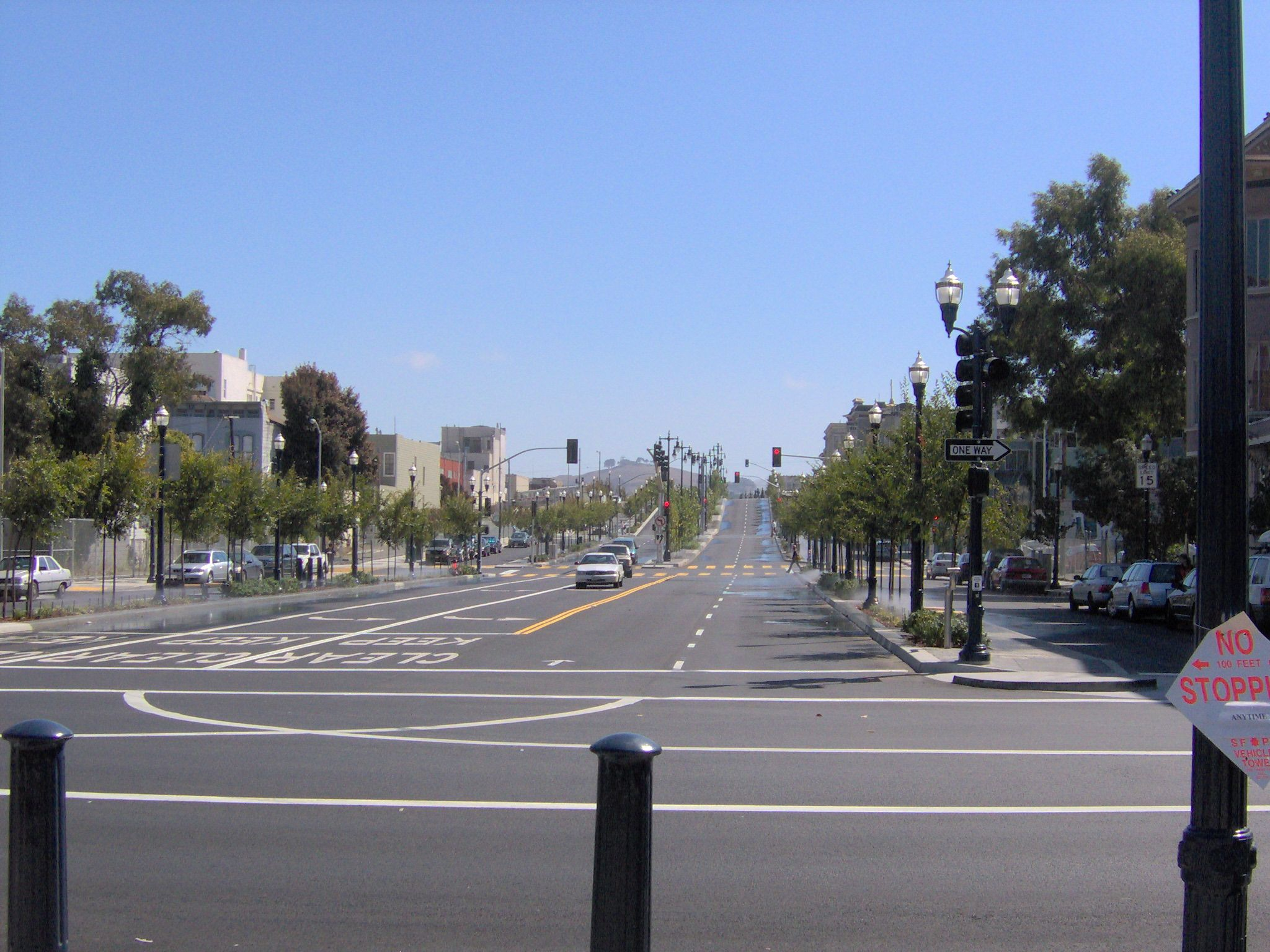
- Looking south along Octavia Boulevard from Fell Street, where the Central Freeway once dominated the landscape
- Interactive map of Octavia Boulevard
- Namesake: Octavia Gough
- Location: San Francisco, California
- South end: US 101 (Central Freeway) in Hayes Valley
- North end: Fell Street in Hayes Valley

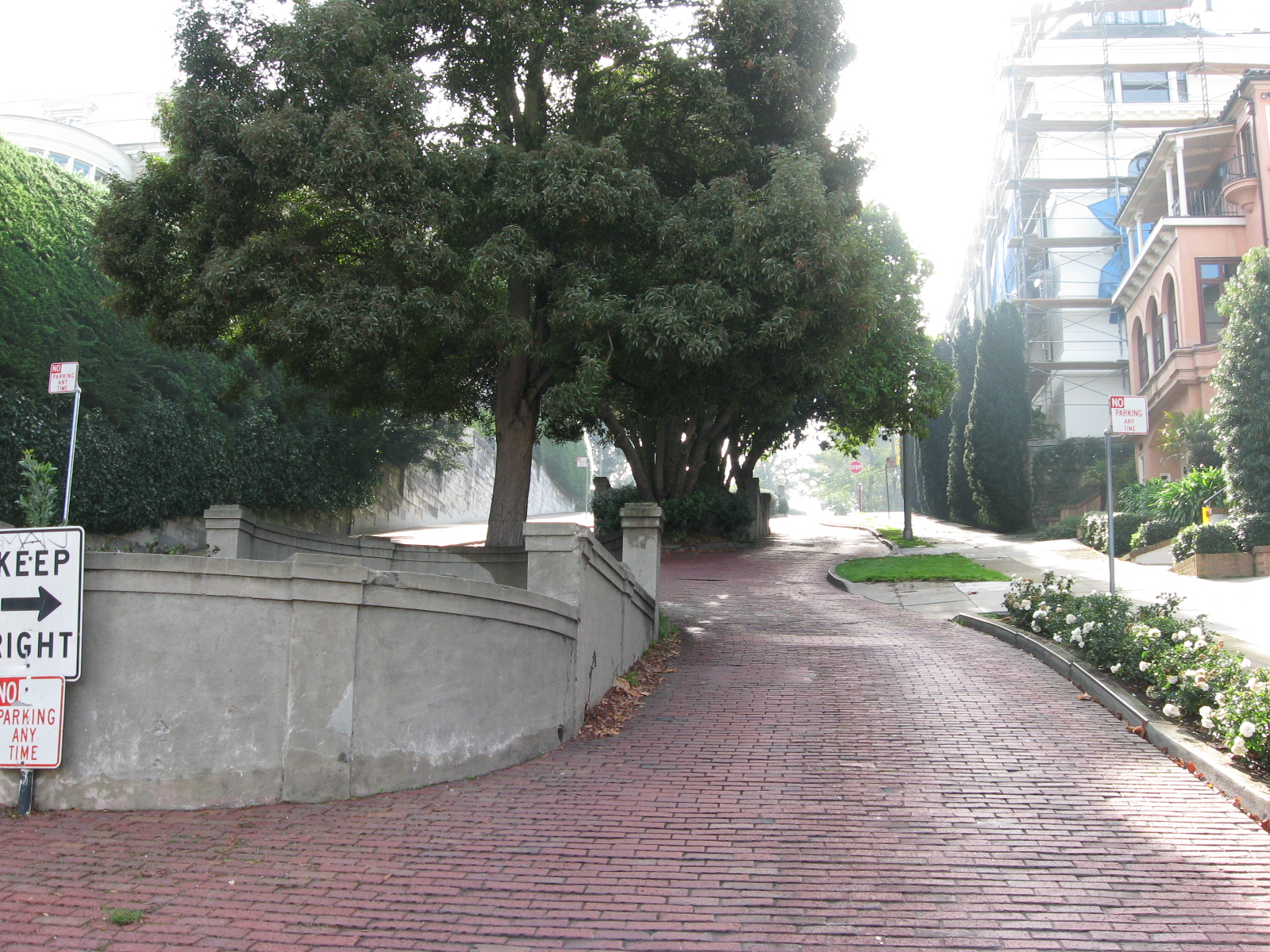
Looking south along Octavia Street from Jackson Street. This is one of the few blocks in San Francisco still paved in brick.

Octavia Boulevard (designated as Octavia Street north of Hayes Street) is a major street in San Francisco, California, United States, that replaced the Hayes Valley portion of the damaged two-level Central Freeway. Once a portion of Octavia Street alongside shadowy, fenced-off land beneath the elevated U.S. Route 101 roadway, Octavia Boulevard was redeveloped and redesigned upon the recommendation of a "Central Freeway" planning committee representing a broad array of neighborhoods, including the surrounding Hayes Valley and Western Addition, the Richmond District, Pacific Heights and the Sunset District with representatives appointed by Mayor Willie Brown and the Board of Supervisors and led by the Planning Department of San Francisco. Elements of the San Francisco General Plan were consulted for issues such as urban design, transportation mobility and congestion management, community safety and historic preservation, along with the evaluation of the impacts following the recent removal (1991) of the elevated Embarcadero Freeway and the revitalization of the Embarcadero as a surface boulevard complemented by an extension of the Muni Metro light-rail transit subway.

Mark Jolles, a local resident attending the meetings, was concerned that the committee was only considering two alternatives to mitigate the removal of the elevated freeway. One was an overpass over Market street which visually blocked the corridor. The other was an underpass under Market Street which was not feasible due to a Muni Metro tunnel perpendicular to the freeway corridor. An underpass would have been too deep and expensive to engineer and implement. Also, Mark was informed the greater conflict was an overpass over Mission Street which had higher traffic volumes than Market Street. He suggested that the committee look at traffic volumes on streets exiting the freeway South of Market. Comparing volumes from the 8th and 9th street couplet off-ramps south of Market, it became clear that an at-grade crossing at Market Street and Octavia and a surface Octavia Blvd was adequate to accommodate forecasted traffic volumes and would be feasible.

Jolles had lived on Haight Street near the freeway for several years in the 1980s. He remembers the freeway blocking views of Victorian structures and the loss of natural sunlight. Blight was caused by the double-decker concrete behemoth overwhelming street life with noise, dust, and shadows. Crime and prostitutes lingering below the structure were also strong memories. This was his motivation to attend the meetings and suggest a more human scale solution to improving mobility in the area.

At one the public meeting, Mark noted that Octavia Street, redesigned as a boulevard, could handle the same volumes. This would make better use of the freeway's right-of-way for additional street space and new housing without the visual impact of an elevated roadway. He cited comparable examples of boulevards including the configuration of Park Presidio Blvd, Funston Street, 14th Avenue in the Richmond District, and Sunset Boulevard in the Sunset District, all in San Francisco.

In addition, Jolles recalled growing up in the 1960s in the Washington, DC, area. He was familiar with boulevard designs there including K Street as well as boulevards that substituted for freeways in the Washington suburbs such as Viers Mill Road and Connecticut Avenue.

Other international comparisons include Paris and the Champs-Élysées design and Napoleon's sponsorship of Baron Haussman's grand boulevards imposed on the maze like Paris street system. They reflect Washington's other grand boulevards in the french influenced plan of the George Washington commissioned planner of our nation's capital, Pierre L'Enfant. The French influence on the Reforma and boulevards in Mexico City during Maximilian's reign in Mexico, and boulevards in French Colonial North African cities are models as well. All of these examples inspired and suggested a boulevard design for Octavia had the pedigree of a successful design.

Most importantly, this type of road geometry provides for better overall access to the street grid than a grade separated freeway. A boulevard separates local traffic from through traffic while still allowing for flexibility during congestion. This benefits motorists who can easily change their route during backups and is ideal for busy urban corridors. For grade separated freeways, due to limited access to local streets, traffic cannot readily adjust during peak periods. Also noted during the discussions was that during heavy traffic, travel times on the boulevard would be superior to those of a backed-up elevated freeway. This suggests there was no benefit to replacing an urban freeway with one of a similar limited access design.

There were two other suggestions made during the meeting. One was to provide a full surface street crosstown boulevard. This included removing the entire elevated freeway along Division to make that a Boulevard as well. When a block of public housing was being replaced at Webster a better connection from that divided street to Oak and Fell could be added. This could have provided an entire surface boulevard from 16th Street all the way to Geary. Improved development along Division could have followed. However, just removing the Octavia Blvd section of freeway was controversial, so the entire solution was considered politically unfeasible.

Finally, there was a suggestion to increase capacity, mobility, and access for non-auto trips along Oak and Fell. This included a future branch of the Market Street F Line west as a couplet along Oak and Fell towards Golden Gate Park. This would provide an attractive non-auto alternative from downtown for commuters, tourists, recreational, and community access to Alamo Square, Haight Street, the Panhandle, and Golden Gate Park's cultural and recreational resources.

The committee was charged to come up with alternatives to rebuilding the damaged double-decked freeway in a six-month public planning process. During this time, the planning services of Allan Jacobs, the former Planning Director and Chair of the UC Berkeley College of Environmental Design and his business partner and UC Berkeley Landscape Architecture professor Elizabeth MacDonald, whose academic studies of landscaped, multi-lane surface roadways were being compiled for publication as "The Boulevard Book" (2002), were engaged. This led to a proposal for rebuilding Octavia Boulevard without the freeway structure, which was concurrently reviewed and ultimately deemed "acceptable" in traffic carrying capacity as an alternative to a freeway ramp by Caltrans, which informed the endorsements of the civic design think-tank SPUR, both the Planning and the Parking and Traffic Commissions, and Mayor Willie Brown in his "State of the City" address in October 1997. Opponents to the demolition of the freeway structure north of Market Street, mostly based in the Richmond and Sunset Districts in the western half of San Francisco, responded by circulating petitions to place a ballot initiative (Proposition H) before voters calling to rebuild the freeway rather than to demolish it.

The ballot measure, which did not include references to the progress and design of the replacement surface boulevard, was passed by the voters in November 1997. Members of the Central Freeway planning committee, led by community activists Robin Levitt and Patricia Walkup, regrouped immediately to draft another ballot initiative (Proposition E) calling for the surface boulevard as the preferred alternative to rebuilding the elevated structure north of Market, supported by the urban design benefits of the boulevard and its acceptability per Caltrans' standards in carrying traffic. Proposition E was approved by the San Francisco voters in November 1998, setting the stage for a first and final side-by-side ballot showdown before the voters in November 1999: the pro-boulevard Proposition I against the pro-freeway initiative Proposition J. Proposition I won (54% to 46%) and Proposition J (47% to 53%) failed, and demolition of the elevated portions of the freeway north of Market was completed in 2003.

Octavia Boulevard is four blocks long from Market to Fell Street, containing multiple lanes that separate local and through traffic. On Octavia, homes and businesses located immediately on the street are served by the quieter outer roadways, while lanes leading to and from the rebuilt Central Freeway spur connect faster traffic with the inner roadways. Having replaced a freeway, the boulevard distributes traffic smoothly and evenly throughout the immediate neighborhood, while maintaining the links to the major San Francisco traffic arterials that the old elevated freeway used to connect to directly, including Fell and Oak Streets (which serve the city's western neighborhoods) and Franklin and Gough Streets (which serve northern neighborhoods and the Golden Gate Bridge). A brand new park named "Patricia's Green" (named in honor of Patricia Walkup, who died in 2006) was created as part of the boulevard project. It lies on Octavia between Fell and Hayes Street.

North of Hayes Street, Octavia continues as Octavia Street through the Western Addition, Pacific Heights and Marina neighborhoods to Bay Street, at Fort Mason.

Other freeway removal projects in the San Francisco Bay, due to seismic stability (or collapse), include the replacement of San Francisco's Embarcadero Freeway, and the reuse of the collapsed Cypress Structure's right-of-way in neighboring Oakland.

== Origin of name ==
The name refers to Octavia Gough, sister of Charles H. Gough. A contractor who carried out the planking and paving of many San Francisco streets, Charles served on the commission to design the layout of streets in the Western Addition, according to an obituary published in the San Francisco Call on July 27, 1895.

== Related places nearby ==
Parallel to Octavia and immediately east of it is Gough Street.

Octavia is eight blocks east of Divisadero, which at the time of its naming was the nearest major north–south thoroughfare. "Octavia" means "the eighth".

There is an octagon-shaped building (named The Octagon House) at 2645 Gough Street, on the northwest corner of Gough and Green streets. As of 2013, it operated as a historic museum, housing colonial-era folk art and documents.

Today, the Academy of Art University owns and operates a building on the street for housing purposes.
