= Tonquin (1845 ship) =

American merchant vessel

The Tonquin was a 496-ton merchant vessel built in 1845 by Waterman & Ewell in Medford, Massachusetts, and owned by George R. Minot and Nathaniel Hooper of Boston. She sailed from New York to San Francisco. On November 19, 1849, she was wrecked at the entrance to San Francisco, on Whaleman's Reef.
