= Central Freeway =

Elevated freeway in San Francisco, California, United States

Central Freeway
- Central Freeway highlighted in red

Route information
- Maintained by Caltrans
- Length: 1.2 mi (1.9 km)
- Existed: 1959–present
- Component highways: US 101 from I-80 to Mission Street

Major junctions
- South end: I-80 / US 101
- North end: Octavia Boulevard

Location
- Country: United States
- State: California
- County: San Francisco

Highway system
- United States Numbered Highway System; List; Special; Divided; State highways in California; Interstate; US; State; Scenic; History; Pre‑1964; Unconstructed; Deleted; Freeways

The Central Freeway is a roughly one-mile (1.5 km) elevated freeway in San Francisco, California, United States, connecting the Bayshore/James Lick Freeway (US 101 and I-80) with the Hayes Valley neighborhood. Most of the freeway is part of US 101, which exits at Mission Street on the way to the Golden Gate Bridge. The freeway once extended north to Turk Street, and initially formed part of a loop around downtown (along with the Embarcadero Freeway), but was damaged along with the Embarcadero in the 1989 Loma Prieta earthquake; both highways have since been replaced with the surface-level Octavia Boulevard (north of Market Street) and Embarcadero, respectively.

== Route description ==
The Central Freeway begins at a directional "Y" interchange at the west end of Interstate 80 in the South of Market neighborhood, and travels west above Division Street and 13th Street. This interchange also includes access between the Bayshore Freeway, which carries US 101 to the south, and the one-way pair of 9th and 10th Streets. As it approaches the end, US 101 exits onto Mission Street to access Van Ness Avenue, which it follows north to Lombard Street and the Golden Gate Bridge. The remainder of the freeway is signed as exit 434B from US 101, and comes to the surface at Market Street and Octavia Boulevard, the latter continuing north to Oak and Fell Streets, a one-way pair west to Golden Gate Park. No traffic from Market Street is allowed to turn onto the freeway, but traffic from the freeway may turn right onto Market. The first opportunity for traffic that instead continues onto the boulevard to leave it is east on Page Street.

Before the Loma Prieta earthquake, the freeway continued beyond Fell Street and then curved northeast, with the northbound side ending at a ramp to Golden Gate Avenue and Franklin Street, and the southbound level touching down to the northwest at Turk and Gough Streets. Until 2007, this land remained mainly undeveloped, filled primarily by parking lots. However, the parcels were sold off to developers in the 2010s and as of 2020, most of it has been converted into a mix of affordable and market-rate housing.

== History ==
=== Plans and original freeway ===
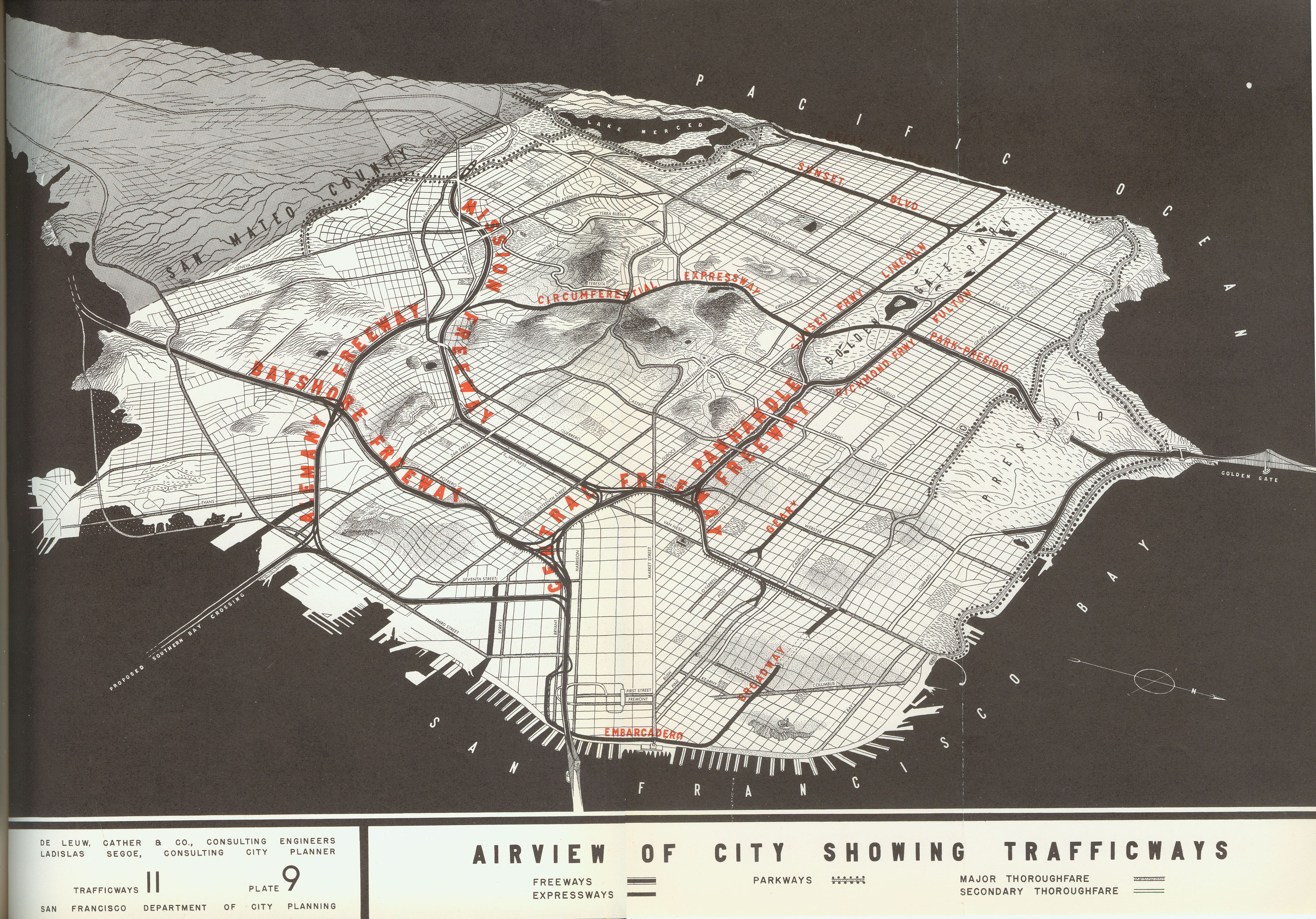
Map from the 1948 Transportation Plan for San Francisco (downtown at the bottom)

The 1948 Transportation Plan for San Francisco, prepared by De Leuw, Cather and Company, included the Central Freeway. This elevated roadway would begin at the Bayshore Freeway – the approach to the San Francisco–Oakland Bay Bridge – near Division Street and head west and north around the periphery of downtown San Francisco. This portion would include junctions with the Mission Freeway (south and southwest along Mission Street to Daly City) at the southwest corner and the Panhandle Freeway (west through the Panhandle into Golden Gate Park) along the west side. After swinging northeast and back north to the east side of Van Ness Avenue (continuing as a double-decked structure between Van Ness Ave. and Polk Street), a pair of ramps would split to the east, taking downtown traffic to and from the one-way pair of Bush and Pine Streets. At Clay Street, the freeway would descend to meet the rising terrain, ending at Broadway just east of Van Ness Avenue as a single level depressed roadway. A short tunnel would curve northwest to a portal in Van Ness Avenue north of Broadway, taking traffic onto Van Ness Avenue towards the Golden Gate Bridge. Along with the Embarcadero and Broadway Tunnel, which were listed for rebuilding as ground-level expressways rather than the freeway (Embarcadero Freeway) that was later partially built and demolished, the Central Freeway would have provided a full traffic distributor loop around downtown.

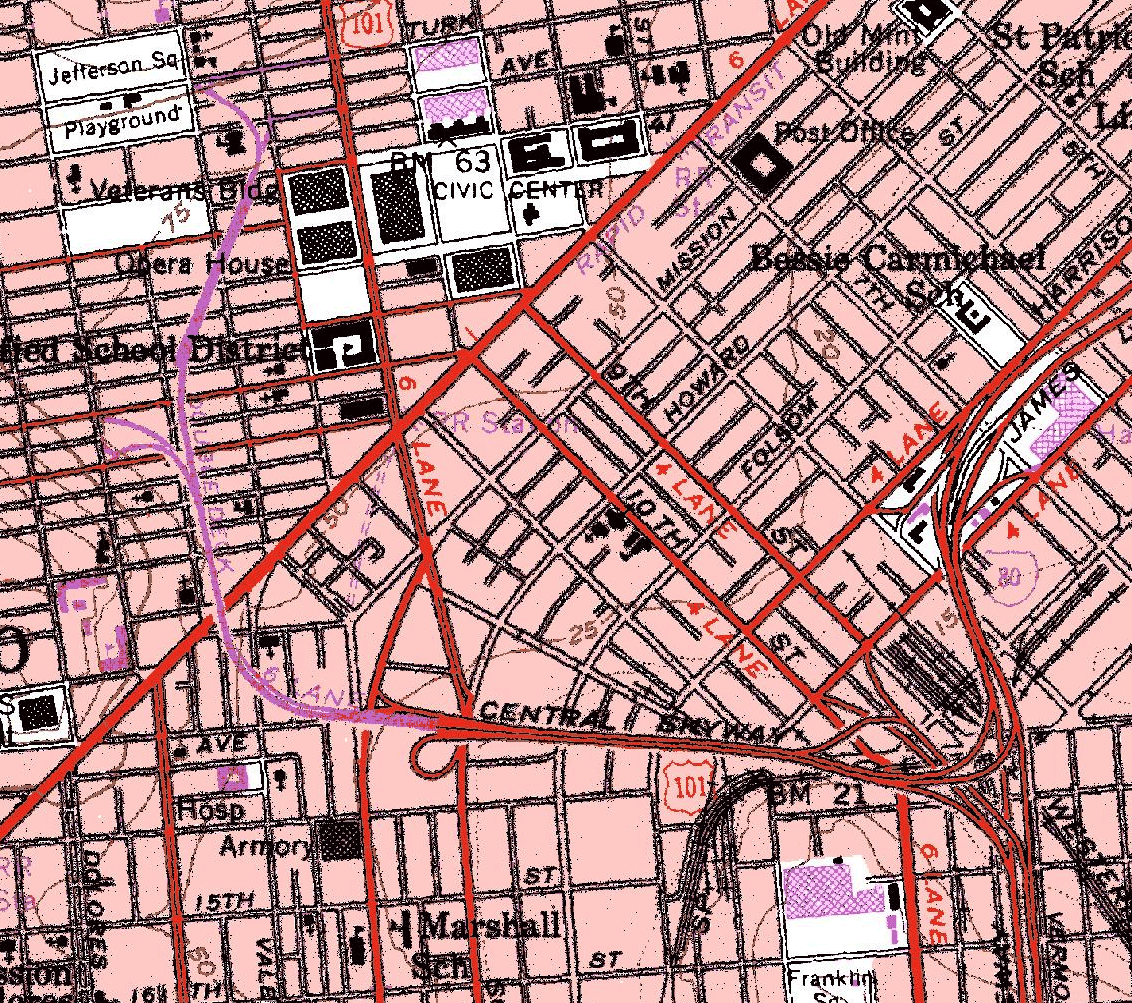
Map of the Central Freeway (red and purple)

The route was also included in the 1955 city master plan, by then extending north beyond the former Broadway terminus to the proposed Golden Gate Freeway near Lombard Street. The first piece, connecting the Bayshore Freeway with Mission Street, opened March 1, 1955, at about the same time as the Bayshore. The part of the Central Freeway to the one-way pair of Golden Gate Avenue and Turk Street opened in April 1959, and became part of U.S. Route 101 (and Legislative Route 2) via this one-way pair to the old route on Van Ness Avenue. In January of that year, as one of the opening events in the freeway revolts, the San Francisco Board of Supervisors passed Resolution 45-59, removing the remainder of the Central Freeway and most other proposed freeways from the city's highway plan. Interstate 80, which had been assigned to the Central Freeway southeast of the proposed Panhandle Freeway, was truncated by the Federal Highway Administration in August 1965 and by the state in 1968.

There was a plan promulgated in February 1962 to relieve traffic congestion on the Golden Gate Bridge by constructing a "San Francisco-Tiburon Bridge" from Van Ness Ave. at Aquatic Park in San Francisco north across the Golden Gate Strait to Tiburon to connect with the Redwood Highway, which would have been anchored on Angel Island. Had this bridge actually been constructed, it would have probably been eventually necessary to construct the proposed northern section of the Central Freeway from Turk Street north to Aquatic Park in order to adequately funnel traffic to it.

=== Truncation ===
In 1989, the Loma Prieta earthquake damaged the northern part of the elevated roadway, and in 1992 Caltrans removed the freeway north of Fell Street and rerouted U.S. 101 to exit at Mission Street and onto the portion of Van Ness Avenue between the Central Freeway and Turk Street/Golden Gate Avenue. That year the Board of Supervisors banned any new freeway construction north of Market Street; a city task force recommended its replacement with a surface boulevard in 1995. Caltrans closed the double-deck freeway north of Mission Street for rebuilding in late 1996 when the upper deck was removed.

A fight began between the primarily Chinese American residents of western San Francisco (the Richmond District and the Sunset District), who favored the Caltrans plan to rebuild it because it provided easy access for prospective customers to get to their businesses in the Richmond and Sunset districts, and the primarily White and Black Hayes Valley local residents, who regarded the freeway as urban blight, and were supported by Mayor Willie Brown. Caltrans reopened the northbound (lower) deck to Fell Street in 1997, but did not put a route designation on that deck; several initiatives were passed to remove the lower deck but was eventually removed in 2003. The final compromise took a two-way freeway down to ground level at Market Street, where Octavia Boulevard – a widened Octavia Street on the former freeway right-of-way — would continue to Fell Street. The completed project opened on September 9, 2005. Unfortunately, this compromise design has resulted in creating one of the most dangerous intersections in the city. Furthermore, the South of Market neighborhood actually got a wider freeway, closer to ground level, in the space where the double-decked road had been. The newer section of the Central Freeway between Mission Street and Market Street still remains unsigned, but is maintained by Caltrans.

Between early 2010 and 2013, when it was partially redeveloped for housing, a 2.2-acre site between Laguna, Oak, Fell, and Octavia Streets in Hayes Valley that had been ramps for the elevated freeway was temporarily converted into Hayes Valley Farm. With a grant from the Mayor's Office of Economic and Workforce Development, raised beds using cardboard as mulch were constructed on the road bed and potted fruit trees and bee hives added.

In 2022, State Senator Scott Wiener submitted a letter to a Caltrans district director requesting a study to investigate demolition of the Central Freeway and other nearby elevated freeways.

== Exit list ==
Except where prefixed with a letter, postmiles were measured on the road as it was in 1964, based on the alignment that existed at the time, and do not necessarily reflect current mileage. Postmile prefixes include: R reflecting a realignment in the route since then, M indicating a second realignment, L referring to an overlap due to a correction or change, and T indicating postmiles classified as temporary. Segments that remain unconstructed or have been relinquished to local control may be omitted. The entire route is in San Francisco.

Postmile	Exit	Destinations	Notes
R4.24		US 101 south (James Lick Freeway) – San Jose	Continuation beyond I-80
R4.24	433B	I-80 east – Bay Bridge, Oakland	Signed as exit 433 southbound; I-80 exit 1B
R4.58	433C	Ninth Street – Civic Center	Northbound exit and southbound entrance
		US 101 north / Mission Street – Golden Gate Bridge	Northbound exit and southbound entrance
R5.20	434A	Duboce Avenue	Northbound exit and southbound entrance
		Market Street	At-grade intersection; only right turns onto Market Street are allowed
R5.40	434B	Octavia Boulevard to Fell Street	Continuation beyond Market Street
		Oak Street	Southbound entrance only (Closed in 1996)
		Fell Street, Laguna Street	Northbound exit only (Closed in 2003)
		Golden Gate Avenue, Franklin Street	Northbound exit only (Closed in 1989)
		Gough Street, Turk Street	Southbound entrance only (Closed in 1989)
1.000 mi = 1.609 km; 1.000 km = 0.621 mi: Closed/former; Incomplete access
