= Van Ness Avenue =

Avenue in San Francisco, California

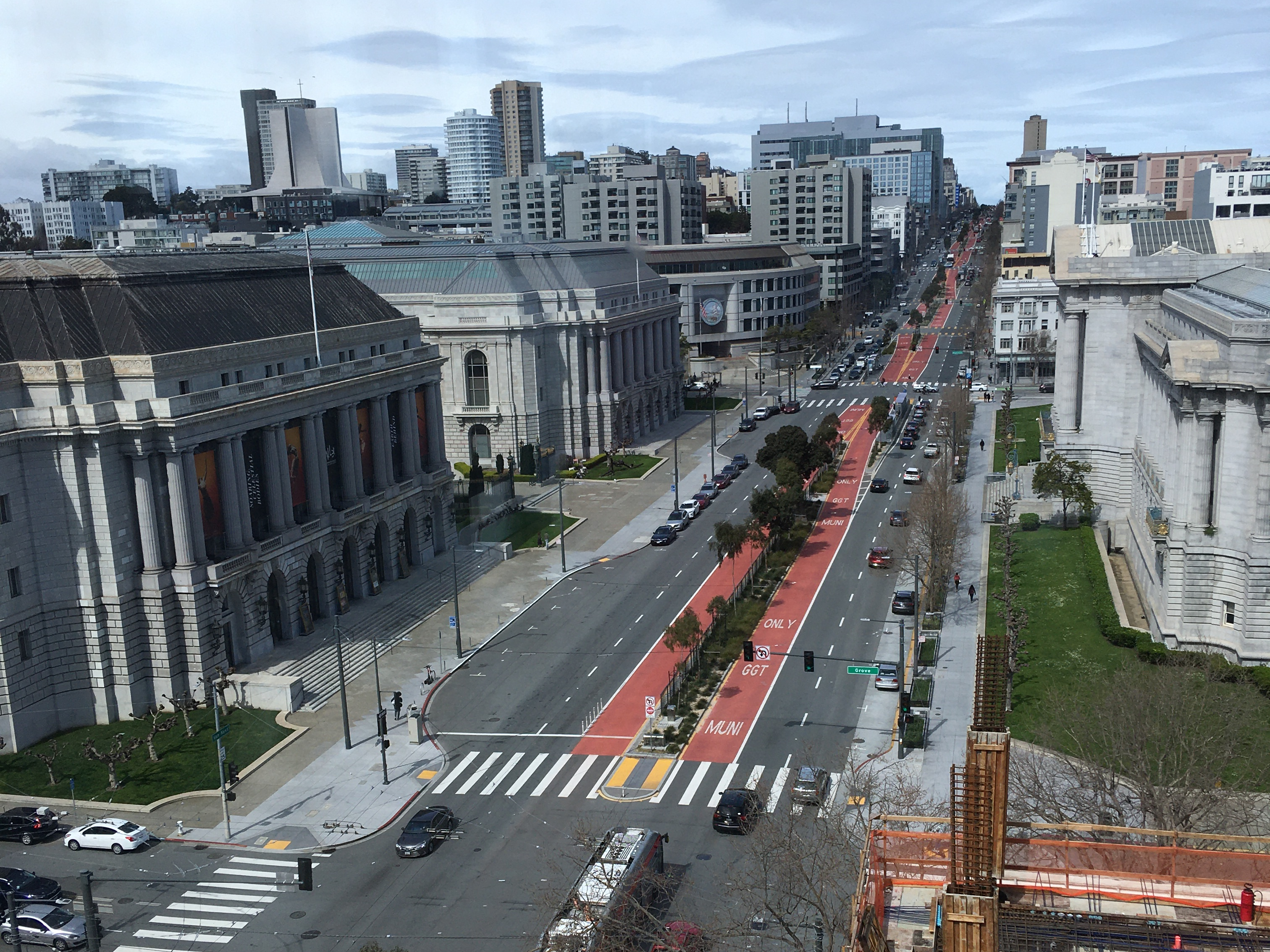
- Van Ness Avenue near San Francisco City Hall in 2024
- Interactive map of Van Ness Avenue
- Former name: Marlette Street
- Part of: US 101 between the Central Freeway and Lombard Street
- Namesake: James Van Ness
- Maintained by: San Francisco DPW, Caltrans
- Length: 4.2 mi (6.8 km)
- Nearest metro station: Van Ness station
- South end: Cesar Chavez (Army) Street
- Major junctions: US 101 south to I-80 east; Mission Street; Market Street; Geary Boulevard; US 101 north / Lombard Street
- North end: Aquatic Park Pier

Van Ness Avenue is a north–south thoroughfare in San Francisco, California. Originally named Marlette Street, the street was renamed in honor of the city's sixth mayor, James Van Ness.

The main part of Van Ness Avenue runs from Market Street near the Civic Center north to Bay Street at Fort Mason. South Van Ness Avenue is the portion of Van Ness south of Market Street, continuing through the city's South of Market and Mission districts to end at Cesar Chavez Street. This southern segment was formerly a continuation of Howard Street, having been renamed by resolution of the Board of Supervisors on August 22, 1932.

The route is designated US 101 from the Central Freeway at the convergence of South Van Ness, Howard Street, and 13th Street, north to Lombard Street. Landmarks along the route include the San Francisco City Hall, the War Memorial Opera House, and Louise M. Davies Symphony Hall.

== History ==
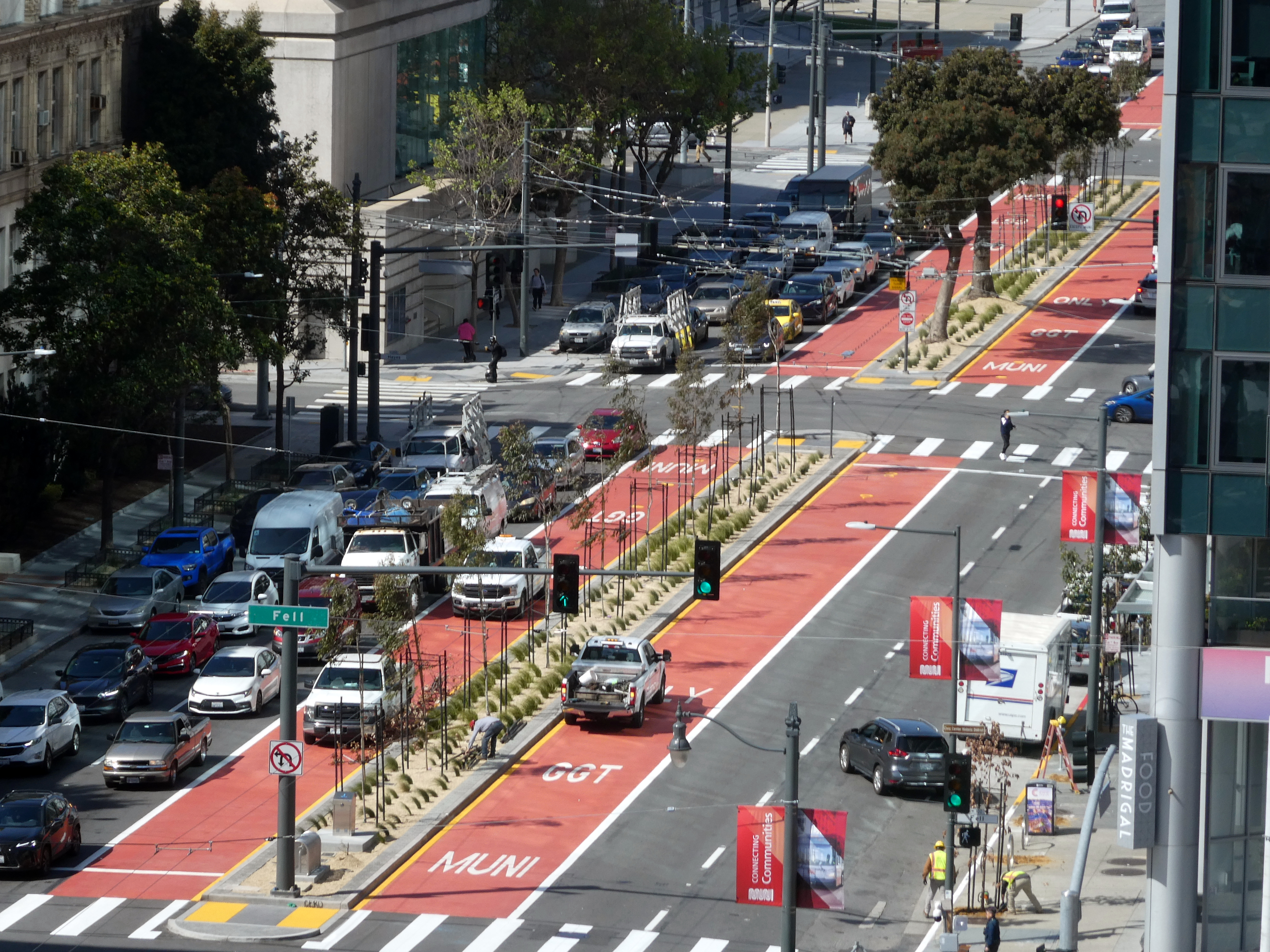
Van Ness Bus Rapid Transit red lanes

Before the 1906 San Francisco earthquake, Van Ness Avenue was known as "the city's grandest boulevard, lined with Victorian mansions and impressive churches". After the earthquake, the street was used as a firebreak by the US Army, dynamiting almost all buildings on its eastern side in an ultimately successful attempt to prevent the firestorm from spreading west to the entire city.

During the 1920s, Van Ness Avenue became known as San Francisco's "Auto Row" as many car dealerships and showrooms opened on the street north of Civic Center. By 2021, Van Ness Avenue had become "an important street without much character, due for a major overhaul", according to the San Francisco Chronicle.

Streetcar service started on Van Ness in 1915 for the opening of the Panama–Pacific International Exposition. The rail lines were removed in the 1950s and replaced with a tree-lined median. Planning for a new rail line on the corridor began in 1989 with the passage of a ballot measure. By 1995, it was to be the last of four major rail corridors constructed in the city. The planned mode was replaced with bus rapid transit in 2003, with studies and environmental analysis lasting the next decade. Construction began in June 2016; the planned completion in 2019 was delayed several times along with cost increases. Service on the Van Ness Bus Rapid Transit corridor began on April 1, 2022. The bus corridor was half the cost of the $346 million Van Ness Improvement Project, which also included utility replacement and pedestrian safety features.

== Major intersections ==
The entire route is in San Francisco.

mi	km	Destinations	Notes
0	0.0	Cesar Chavez Street	
1.5	2.4	US 101 south (Central Freeway) to I-80 east – San Jose	South end of US 101 overlap; interchange
1.8	2.9	Mission Street	
1.9	3.1	Market Street	
2.6	4.2	Geary Boulevard	
3.7	6.0	US 101 north (Lombard Street) – Golden Gate Bridge	North end of US 101 overlap
3.9	6.3	Bay Street	"Three Corners"
1.000 mi = 1.609 km; 1.000 km = 0.621 mi: Concurrency terminus

== Notable buildings ==
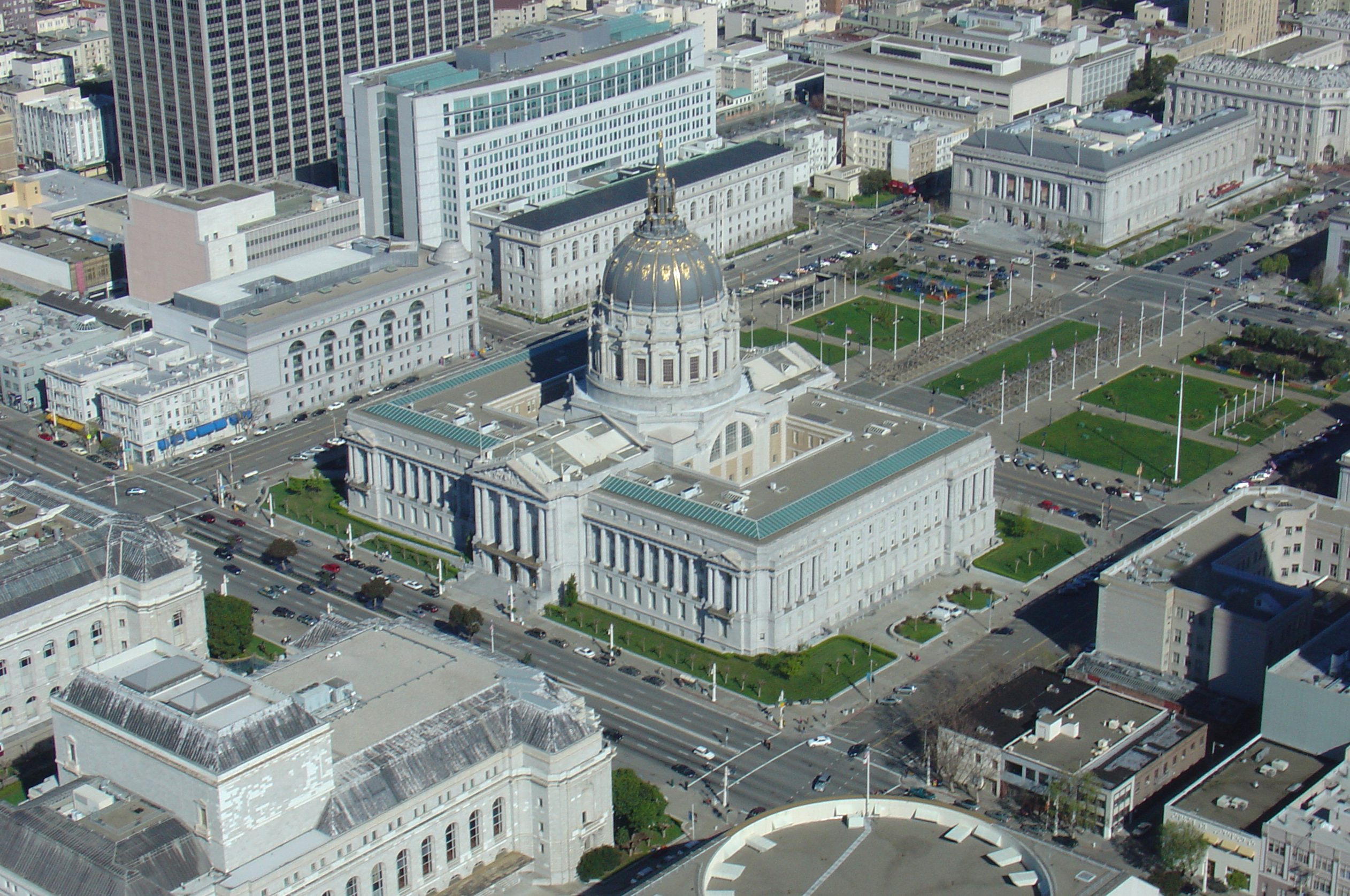
City Hall with Van Ness Avenue in the foreground

Notable buildings on Van Ness Avenue include (listed from north to south):

- Pumping Station No. 2. at the northern end near the bay
- Paige Motor Car Co. Building, at Sacramento Street
- Regency Center, event venue at Sutter Street
- California Public Utilities Commission at McAllister Street
- San Francisco City Hall, Herbst Theatre, and the War Memorial Opera House, all on the block between McAllister Street and Grove Street
- Louise M. Davies Symphony Hall between Grove Street and Hayes Street
- The San Francisco Conservatory of Music's Bowes Center, at Hayes Street
- 100 Van Ness Avenue, a residential skyscraper at Fell Street
- New Conservatory Theatre Center, at Oak Street
