= Russian Hill-Paris Block Architectural District =

- U.S. National Register of Historic Places
- U.S. Historic district
- California Historical Landmark
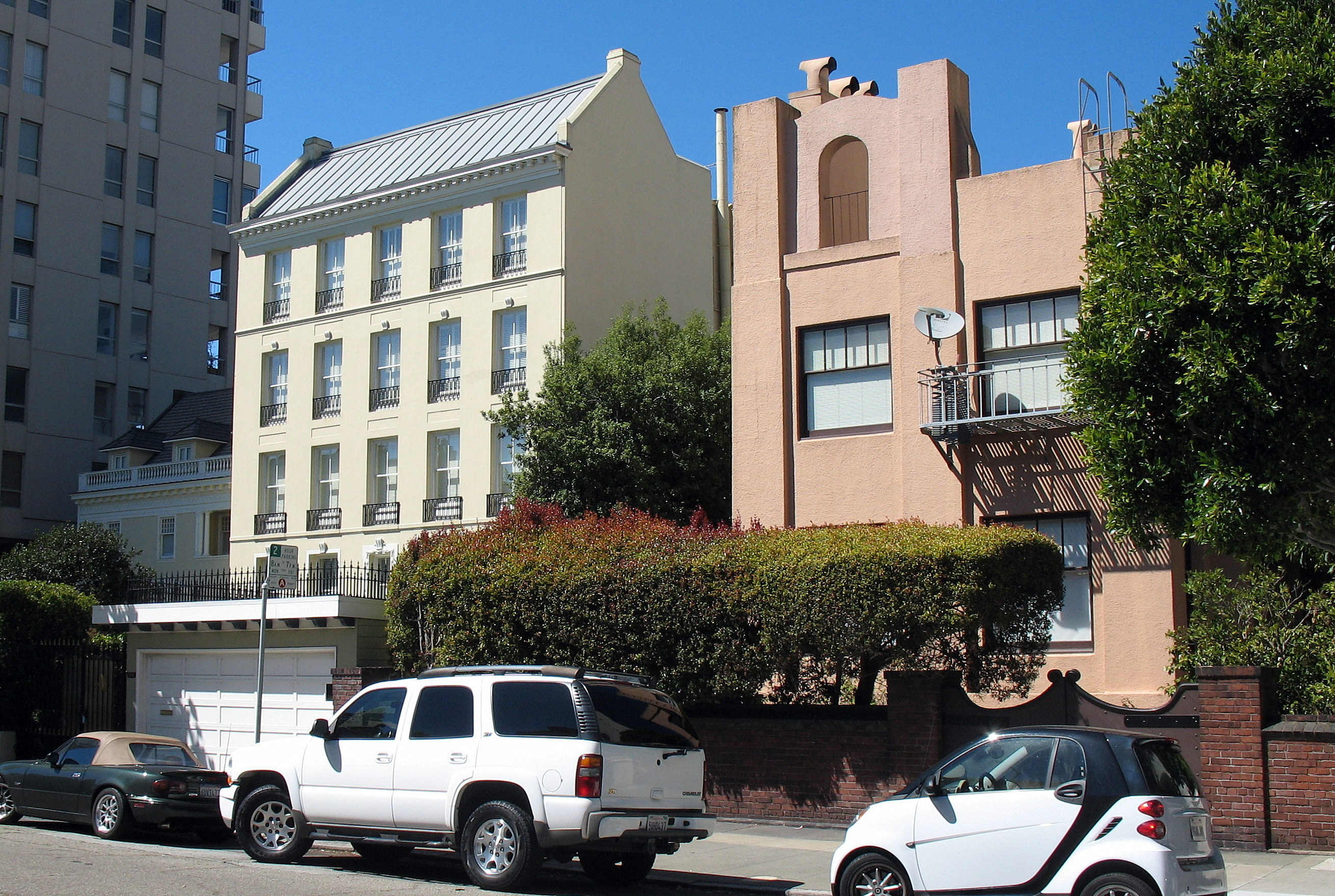

- Location within San Francisco County Location within California Location within the United States
- Location: Roughly 1017--1067 Green St., San Francisco, California
- Coordinates: 37°47′55″N 122°24′54″W
- Area: 1.5 acres (0.61 ha)
- Built: 1891
- Architect: L.P. Hobart
- Architectural style: Late 19th And 20th Century Revivals, Italianate, Pueblo Mission Revival
- NRHP reference No.: 87002288
- CHISL No.: N1543

Significant dates
- Added to NRHP: January 7, 1988
- Designated CHISL: January 7, 1988

The Russian Hill-Paris Block Architectural District is a 1.5-acre (0.61 ha) historic district located in the Russian Hill area of San Francisco, California, that was listed on the National Register of Historic Places on January 7, 1988, for architecture. The area is a residential enclave.

== About ==
The area is roughly bound by the addresses 1017 to 1067 Green Street, in San Francisco, California; a group of eleven single or multiple residential dwellings. The eleven buildings represent eleven different architectural styles, but are united by their high level of quality, and they all sit similarly on their lots with front yards. The houses facing the north side of the Green Street have their back property line along Macondray Lane. One of the residences within the district is the Feusier Octagon House.

The name "Paris Block" has been found in print only as early as 1964, the exact origins are unknown but it is speculated the name refers to the Parisian-appearing Bos Apartments (1050 Green Street), which were designed by Beaux-Arts de Paris-trained architect, Lewis P. Hobart.

Other historic districts in Russian Hill include the Russian Hill–Macondray Lane District and the Russian Hill-Vallejo Street Crest District.

== See also ==
- California Historical Landmarks in San Francisco
- National Register of Historic Places listings in San Francisco
