= Russian Hill–Macondray Lane District =

Historic district in California, United States

- U.S. National Register of Historic Places
- U.S. Historic district
- California Historical Landmark
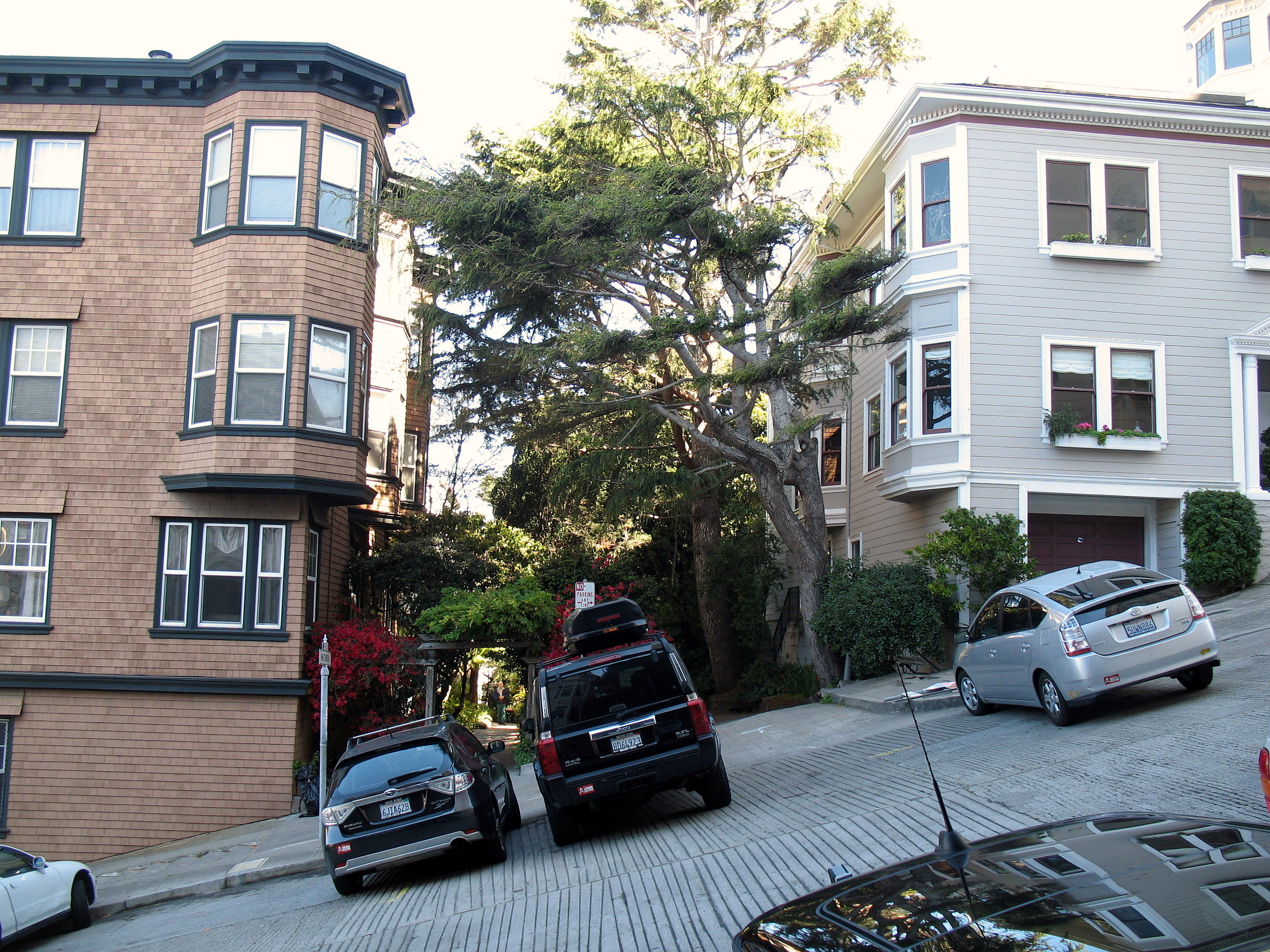

- Location within San Francisco County Location within California Location within the United States
- Location: Roughly 900-982 Green, 1918-1960 Jones, 15-84 Macondray & 1801-1809 Taylor, San Francisco, California
- Coordinates: 37°47′57″N 122°24′43″W
- Area: 1.6 acres (0.65 ha)
- Architect: Multiple
- Architectural style: Colonial Revival, Queen Anne, Mission/spanish Revival
- NRHP reference No.: 87002286
- CHISL No.: N1542

Significant dates
- Added to NRHP: January 7, 1988
- Designated CHISL: January 7, 1988

The Russian Hill–Macondray Lane District is a 1.6-acre (0.65 ha) historic district in Russian Hill, San Francisco, California, that was listed on the National Register of Historic Places on January 7, 1988, for the architecture.

== About ==
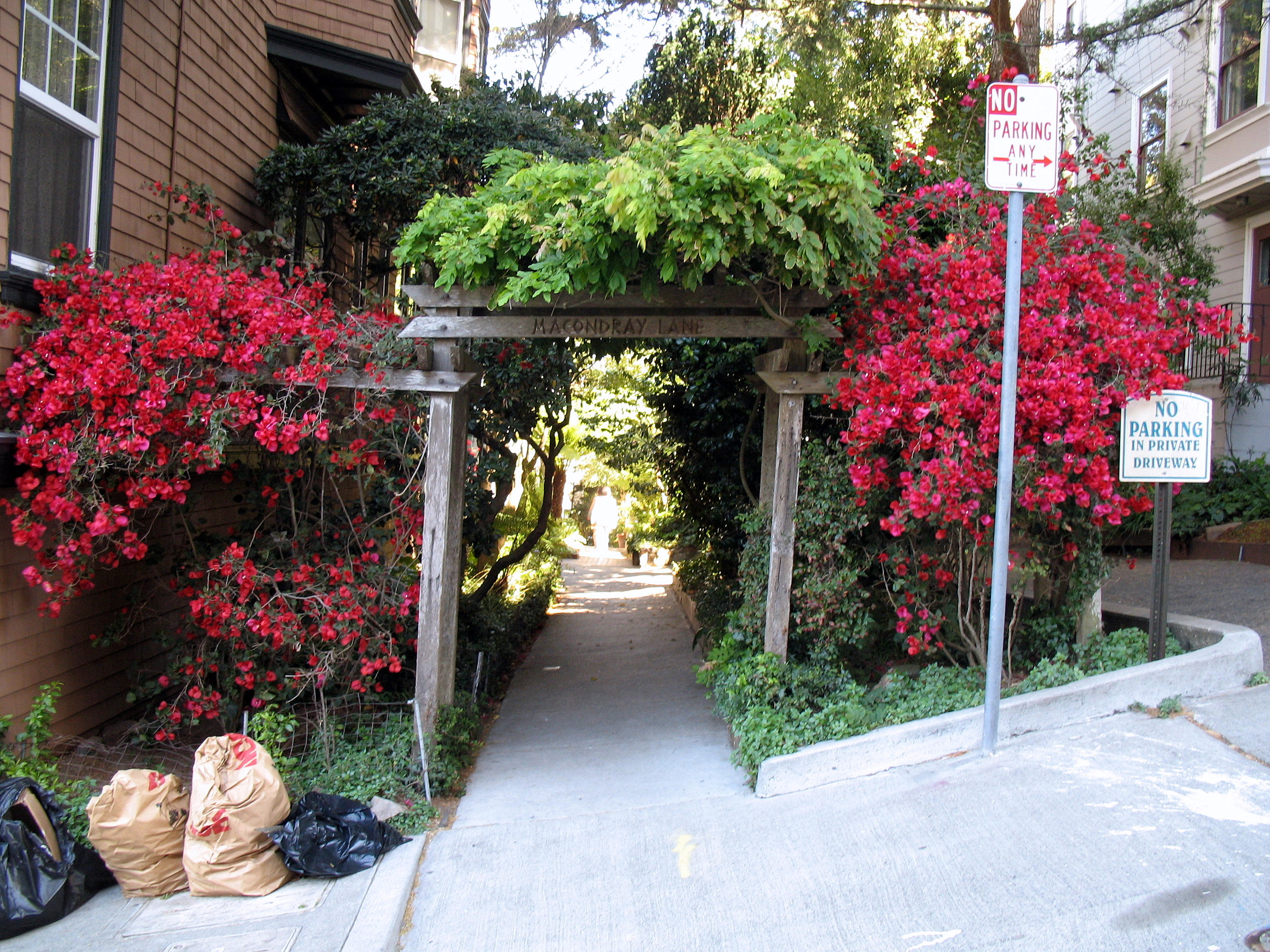
Macondray Lane entrance off of Jones Street

The area is roughly bound by 900–982 Green Street, 1918–1960 Jones Street, 15–84 Macondray Lane, and 1801–1809 Taylor Street, in San Francisco, California. The listing included 12 contributing buildings and one contributing site, Macondray Lane. Only four of the houses in this historic district had survived the 1906 San Francisco earthquake and fire. The oldest surviving house in the district is 982 Green Street, built in 1878.

Most of the early residents had middle class careers, with the exception of three homes on Green Street at the top of the hill. The district had residents working in the arts, as well as Italian-Americans, some of which originated from Genoa. Notable former residents of this neighborhood include Giuseppe Cadenasso, Ina Coolbrith, Charles Caldwell Dobie, Anita Whitney, A. G. McAdie, Charles S. Ross, Curtis Redfern, Charles Bovone, Edward Rowland, Batista DeVincenzi, Edward Huber Jr., Eleanor Ross, and W. H. B. Fowler.

Other historic districts in Russian Hill include the Russian Hill-Vallejo Street Crest District and the Russian Hill-Paris Block Architectural District.

== See also ==
- National Register of Historic Places listings in San Francisco
