= Russian Hill, San Francisco =

Neighborhood in San Francisco

Russian Hill
- Neighborhood
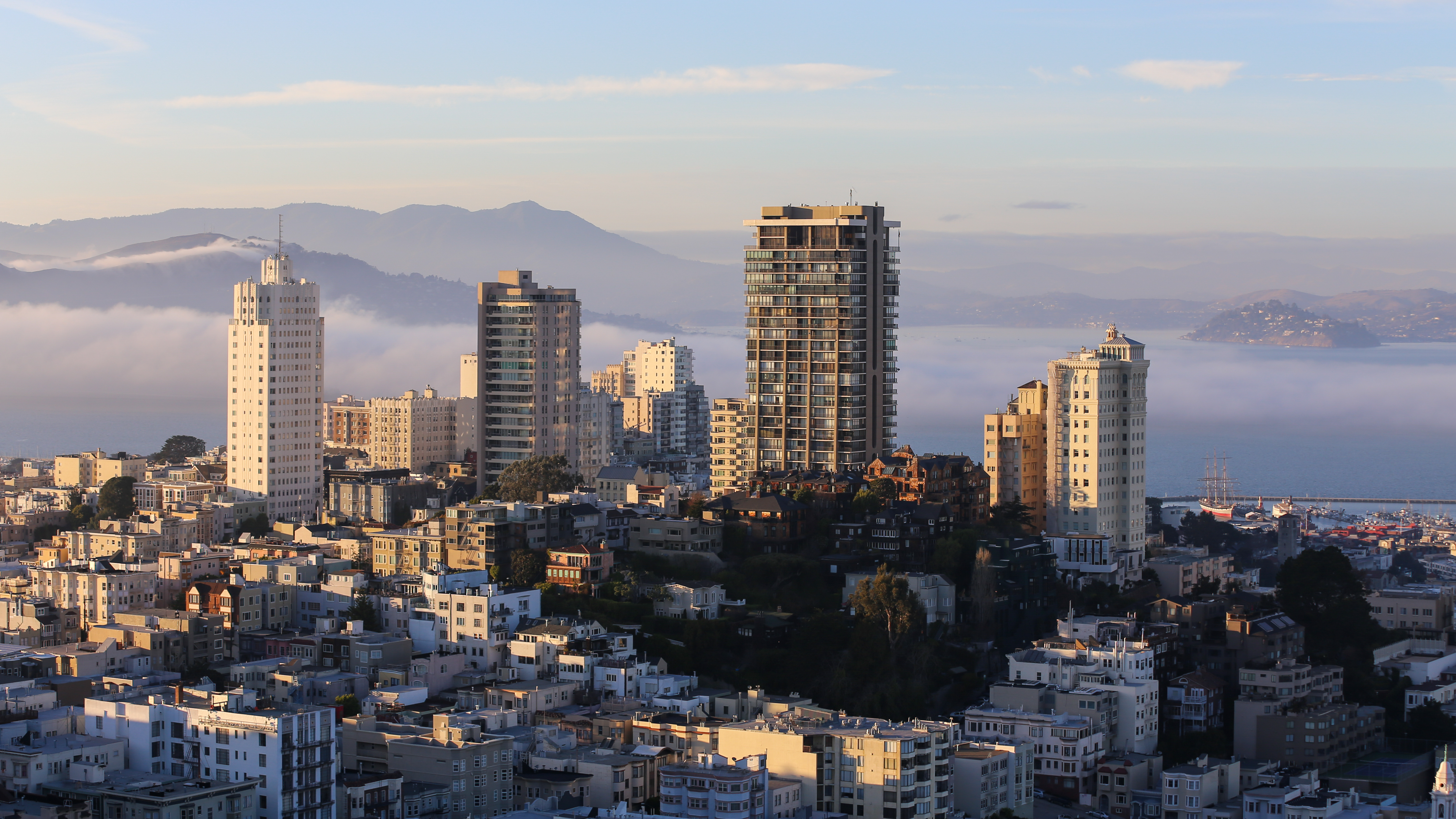
- Russian Hill seen from the southeast

- Location within Central San Francisco
- Coordinates: 37.8018°N 122.4198°W
- Country: United States
- State: California
- City and county: San Francisco

Government
  - Supervisor: Catherine Stefani
  - Assemblymember: Matt Haney (D)
  - State Senator: Scott Wiener (D)
  - U. S. Rep.: Nancy Pelosi (D)

Area
  - Total: 0.397 sq mi (1.03 km^{2})

Population
  - Total: 13,146
  - Density: 33,100/sq mi (12,800/km^{2})
- Time zone: UTC−8 (Pacific)
  - Summer (DST): UTC−7 (PDT)
- ZIP codes: 94109, 94133
- Area codes: 415/628

Russian Hill is a neighborhood of San Francisco, California. It is named after one of San Francisco's 44 hills, and one of its original "Seven Hills".

== Location ==
Russian Hill is directly to the north (and slightly downhill) from Nob Hill, to the south (uphill) from Fisherman's Wharf, and to the west of the North Beach neighborhood. The Hill is bordered on its west side by parts of the neighborhoods of Cow Hollow and the Marina District.

At the northern foot of the hill is Ghirardelli Square, which sits on the waterfront of the San Francisco Bay, Aquatic Park, and Fisherman's Wharf, a popular tourist area. A trip down the winding turns of Lombard Street and across Columbus Avenue to the east leads to the neighborhood of North Beach. Down the hill to the west, past Van Ness Avenue, are Cow Hollow and the Marina districts.

== History ==
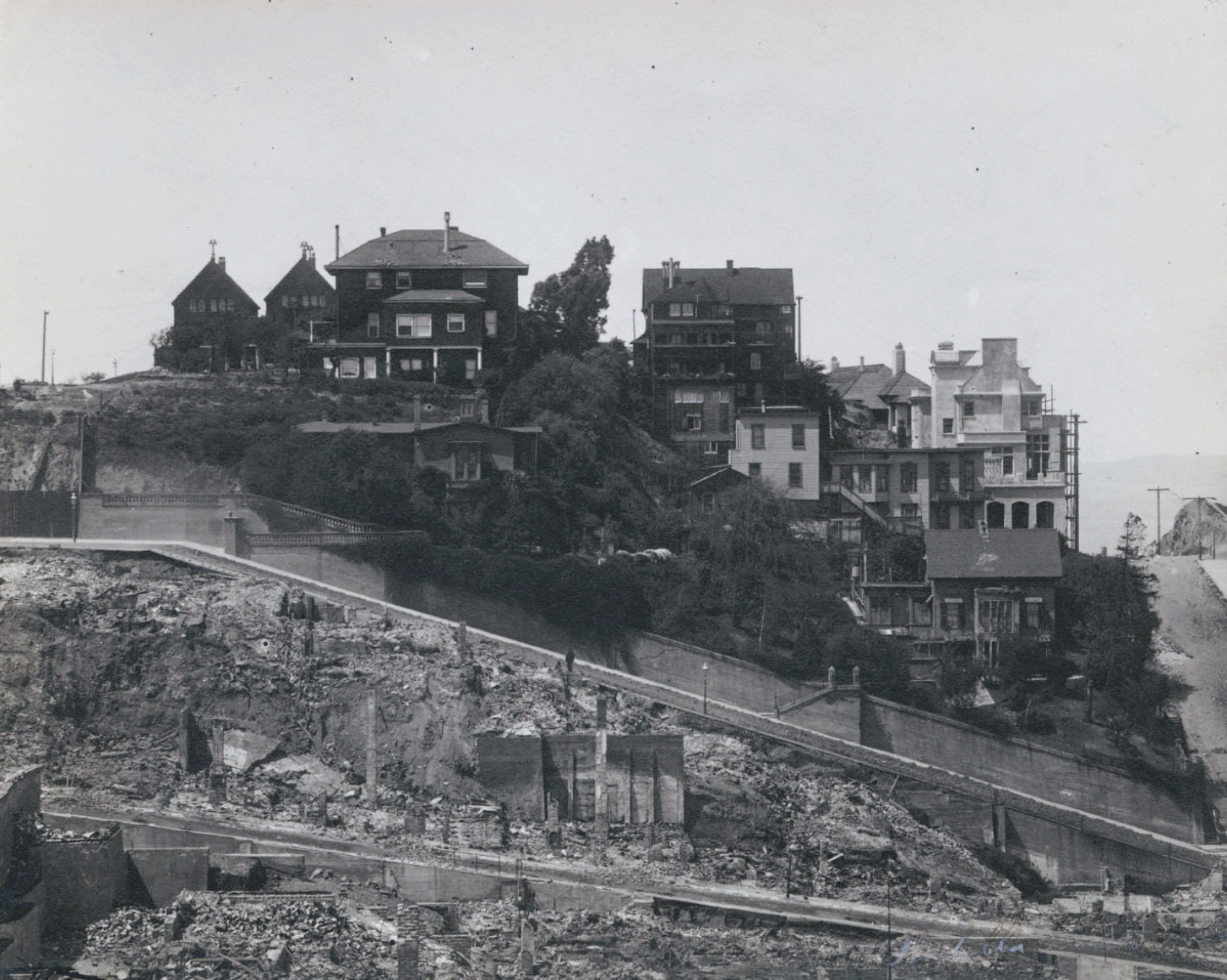
The Russian Hill Vallejo Street Crest, in April 1906 after the earthquake; view of the Atkinson House

The neighborhood's name goes back to the gold rush-era, when settlers discovered a small Russian cemetery at the top of the hill. Russian naval and merchant ships frequently visited San Francisco throughout the 19th century beginning in 1806, and there are several mentions of burials of crew members in the Russian Hill cemetery in the first half of the century. The cemetery was eventually removed, but the name remained.

Since San Francisco became part of the U.S. in 1848, ceded from Mexico along with the rest of California, this northern slope overlooking the bay has been considered one of the city's elite districts. In 1853 and 1854, a partnership was formed by William H. Ranlett (the architect), Charles Homer (the general contractor), and Joseph H. Atkinson (the mason/brick contractor), in order to build three houses in Russian Hill (at what is now known as the Vallejo Street Crest). The Atkinson House (1853) is one of the oldest houses still standing in San Francisco, and possibly one of the first examples of Italianate-style architecture in the city. It was one of the few homes in the neighborhood to have survived the 1906 earthquake, with most Russian Hill residents being forced to rebuild.

The switchbacks design of Lombard Street was first suggested by property owner Carl Henry and was built in 1922, intended to reduce the hill's natural 27 percent grade, which was too steep for most vehicles to climb.

== About and attractions ==
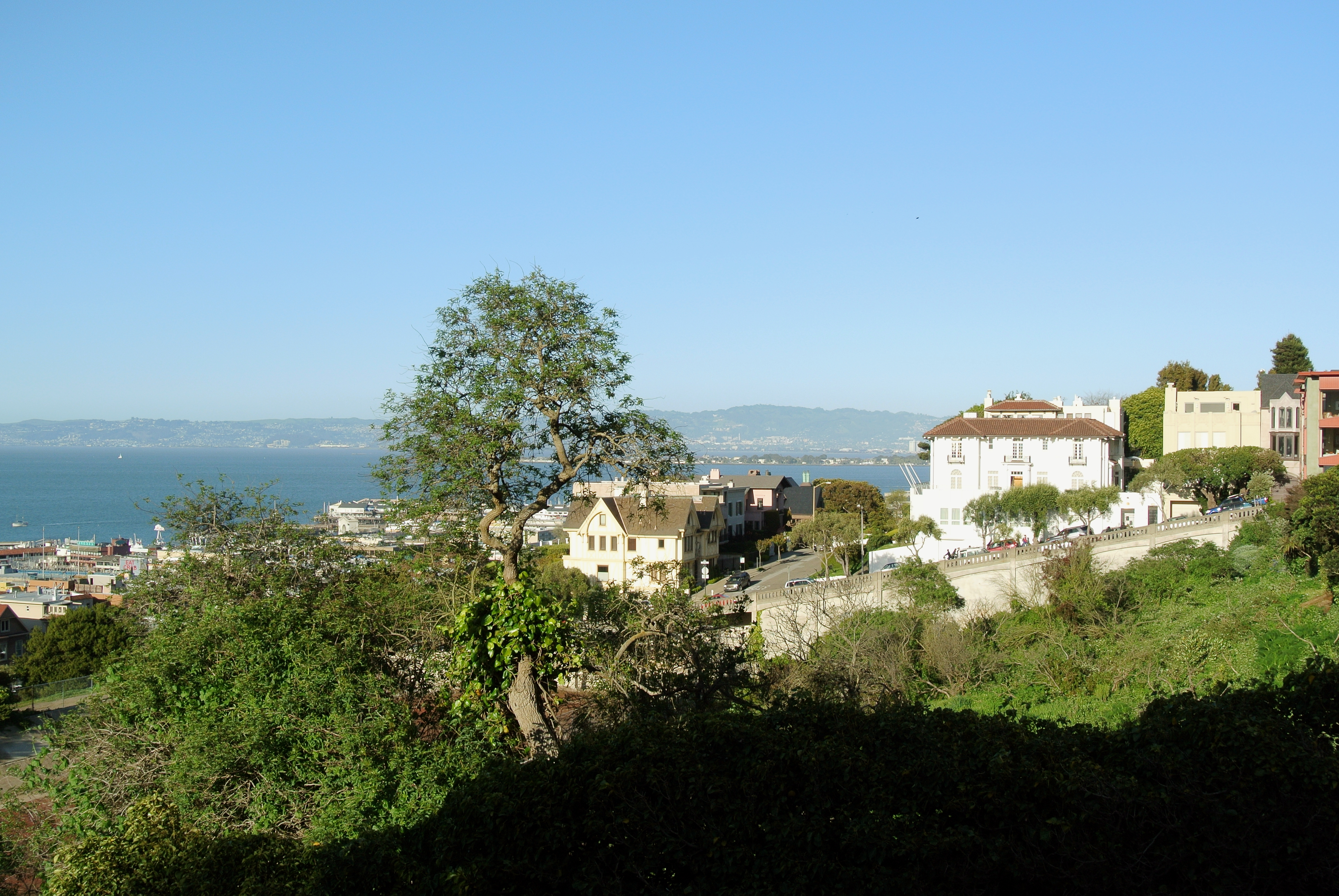
View from Russian Hill (Larkin Street) towards east

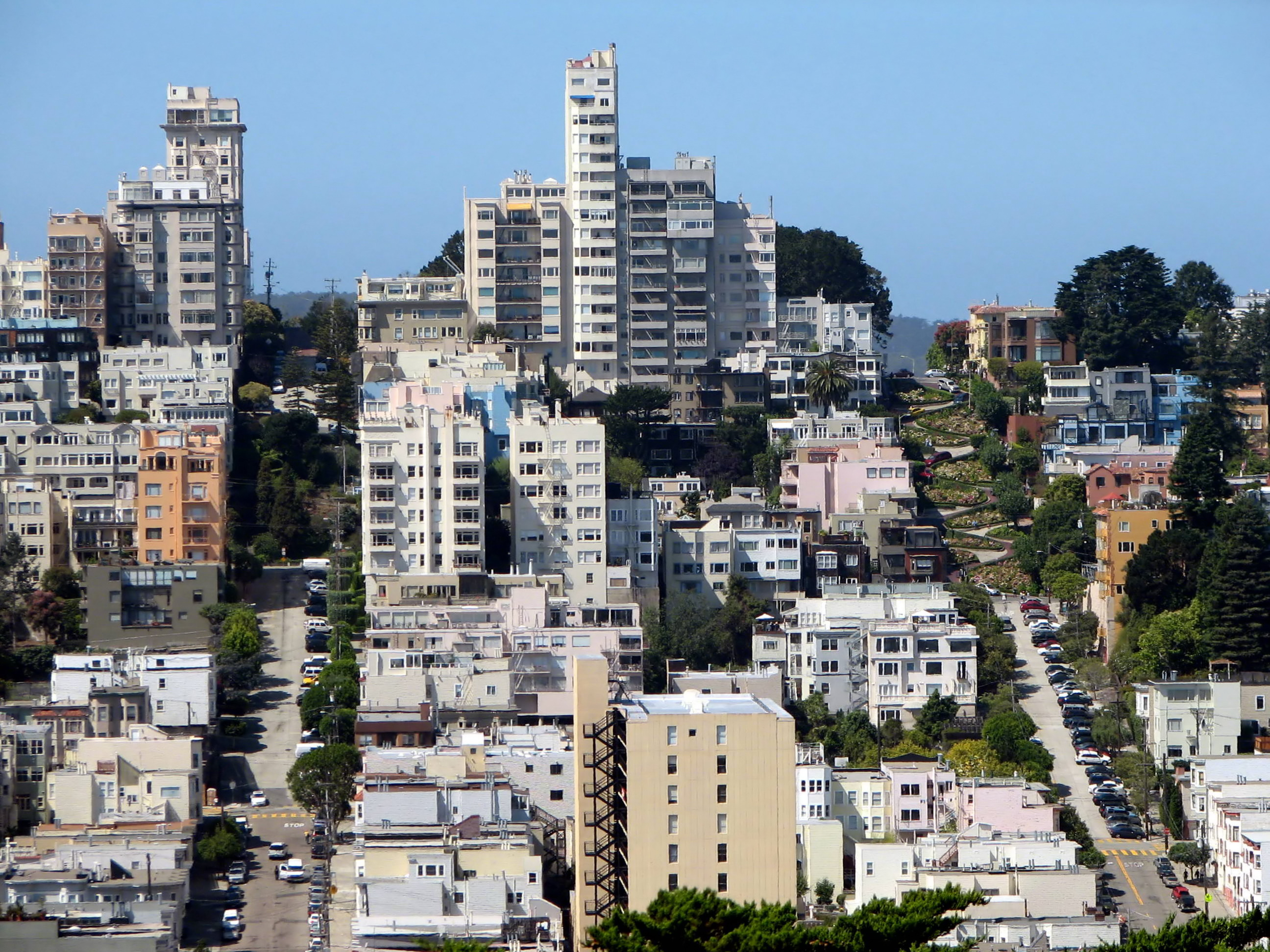
A view of Lombard Street and Russian Hill from Telegraph Hill. The picture includes the famous "World's crookedest street" portion of Lombard Street.

=== Districts and views ===
Because of the steepness of the hill, many streets, portions of Vallejo and Green streets, for example, are staircases. Views from the top of the hill extend in several directions around the Bay Area, including the Bay Bridge, Marin County, the Golden Gate Bridge and Alcatraz. The Macondray Lane District is notable for its historic architecture in a hilly and woodsy area, which features the pedestrian-only Macondray Lane. The Paris Block Architectural District is a residential area known for its architecture, including the Feusier Octagon House.

The Vallejo Street Crest Historic District is located in the southeast portion of the hill and is known for the cultural history and architecture, the district is surrounded by a retaining wall and natural bluff. A small park at the top of the hill on Vallejo Street (or the Vallejo Street Crest) features a small plaque and memorial placed by the Russian Government, that is dedicated to the original Russian cemetery that once stood there. Another park on the hill on Vallejo Street is named after Ina Coolbrith.

Russian Hill is home to the former San Francisco Art Institute, located on Chestnut Street between Jones and Leavenworth Streets. The Academy of Art University also maintains a presence in this neighborhood with their Chestnut Street building hosting their fine art MFA studios, photo classrooms, and photo studios.

=== Lombard Street ===
The neighborhood is most famous for Lombard Street, the one-way section on Russian Hill between Hyde and Leavenworth Streets, in which the roadway has eight sharp turns (or switchbacks) that have earned the street the distinction of being "the crookedest street in the world". As it is one of the most visited tourist attractions in the city, this section of the neighborhood is frequently crowded with tourists. Tourists also frequent the cable car line along Hyde Street, which is lined with many restaurants and shops.

=== Parks ===
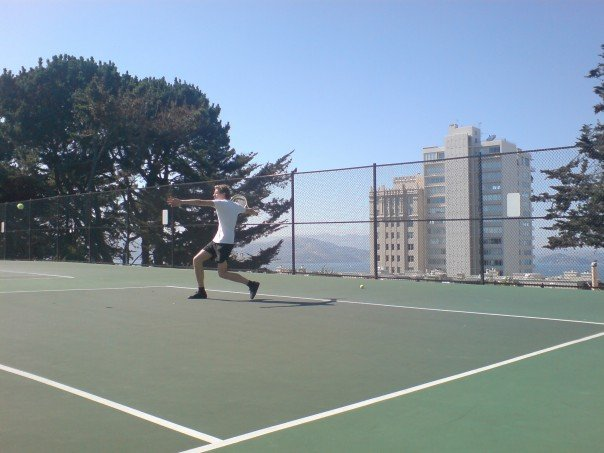
Alice Marble tennis courts

Alice Marble Tennis Courts are four hardcourt tennis courts located at Lombard and Hyde Streets. The courts offer a view of the bay and North Beach and can be unsuitable for tennis on windy days. A basketball court is located adjacent to the tennis courts. The San Francisco Cable Cars serving the Powell-Hyde line stops nearby.

There are also multiple dog parks in Russian Hill. Francisco Park has an off-leash dog play area along Bay St., and Michelangelo Playground Park is also fenced but it is shared with a basketball court and children's play area. George Sterling Park, which is home to the Alice Marble Tennis Courts, has a wooded area that is dog-friendly and is elevated above Larkin St. but is not fenced.

== Government and infrastructure ==
San Francisco Police Department Central Station, Metro Division serves Russian Hill.

== Education ==
It is in the San Francisco Unified School District (SFUSD) and is within the Jean Parker Elementary School attendance area. The school building was first built in 1911 and rebuilt in 1996. Galileo Academy of Science and Technology, a public high school, is located in northern part of the neighborhood.

== Notable residents ==
- Sam Altman, CEO of OpenAI
- Brian Boitano, American figure skater
- Gelett Burgess, writer
- Giuseppe Cadenasso, painter
- Neal Cassady, writer
- Alison Collins, former San Francisco School Board Commissioner
- Ina Coolbrith, writer, librarian
- Harmeet Dhillon, lawyer and Republican party official
- Maynard Dixon, painter
- Charles Caldwell Dobie, author
- Sara Bard Field, poet
- Milton Friedman, economist and Nobel Prize Winner
- Elizabeth Holmes, Theranos founder and CEO
- Jack Kerouac, writer
- Dorothea Lange, photographer
- Gavin Newsom, former mayor of San Francisco, and Governor of California
- Cynthia Oti, radio show host
- Willis Polk, architect
- William H. Ranlett, architect
- Mary Curtis Richardson, painter
- Herbert Sandler, banker
- Alma de Bretteville Spreckels, philanthropist and socialite, childhood home was on the 1000 block of Francisco St.
- Andrew Summers Rowan, army officer
- Fanny Stevenson, wife of Robert Louis Stevenson
- Anita Whitney, political activist
- Rose Wilder Lane, writer and daughter of Laura Ingalls Wilder

== In fiction ==
Life in the neighborhood during the 1970s was used as the basis for the fictionalized series Tales of the City by Armistead Maupin.

Much of the famous car chase sequence in the 1968 thriller Bullitt, starring Steve McQueen (whose character lived in Nob Hill on Taylor and Clay streets), were filmed on Russian Hill, notably the scenes on Taylor Street. The neighborhood was also featured in the early scenes of the 1982 action-comedy feature film, 48 Hrs.

The cast of The Real World: San Francisco, which aired in 1994, lived in the house at 949 Lombard Street on Russian Hill from February 12 to June 19, 1994.

In Anne Rice's book The Wolf Gift, the main character, Reuben Golding, grew up in Russian Hill.

John "Scottie" Ferguson, a character played by James Stewart lives at 900 Lombard Street in Alfred Hitchcock's film Vertigo (1958).

Based on the view from the window, Admiral James T. Kirk's apartment seen in the films Star Trek II: The Wrath of Khan and Star Trek III: The Search for Spock was located in the Russian Hill area of San Francisco.

In the racing video game Blur, one of the courses is named after and closely resembles Russian Hill.

A parody of Russian Hill appears as a district in the 1997 video game Grand Theft Auto, named 'Soviet Hill'.

== See also ==
- San Francisco cable car system
- List of San Francisco, California Hills
- List of San Francisco Designated Landmarks
- National Register of Historic Places listings in San Francisco
