= Atkinson House (San Francisco) =

Historic building in San Francisco

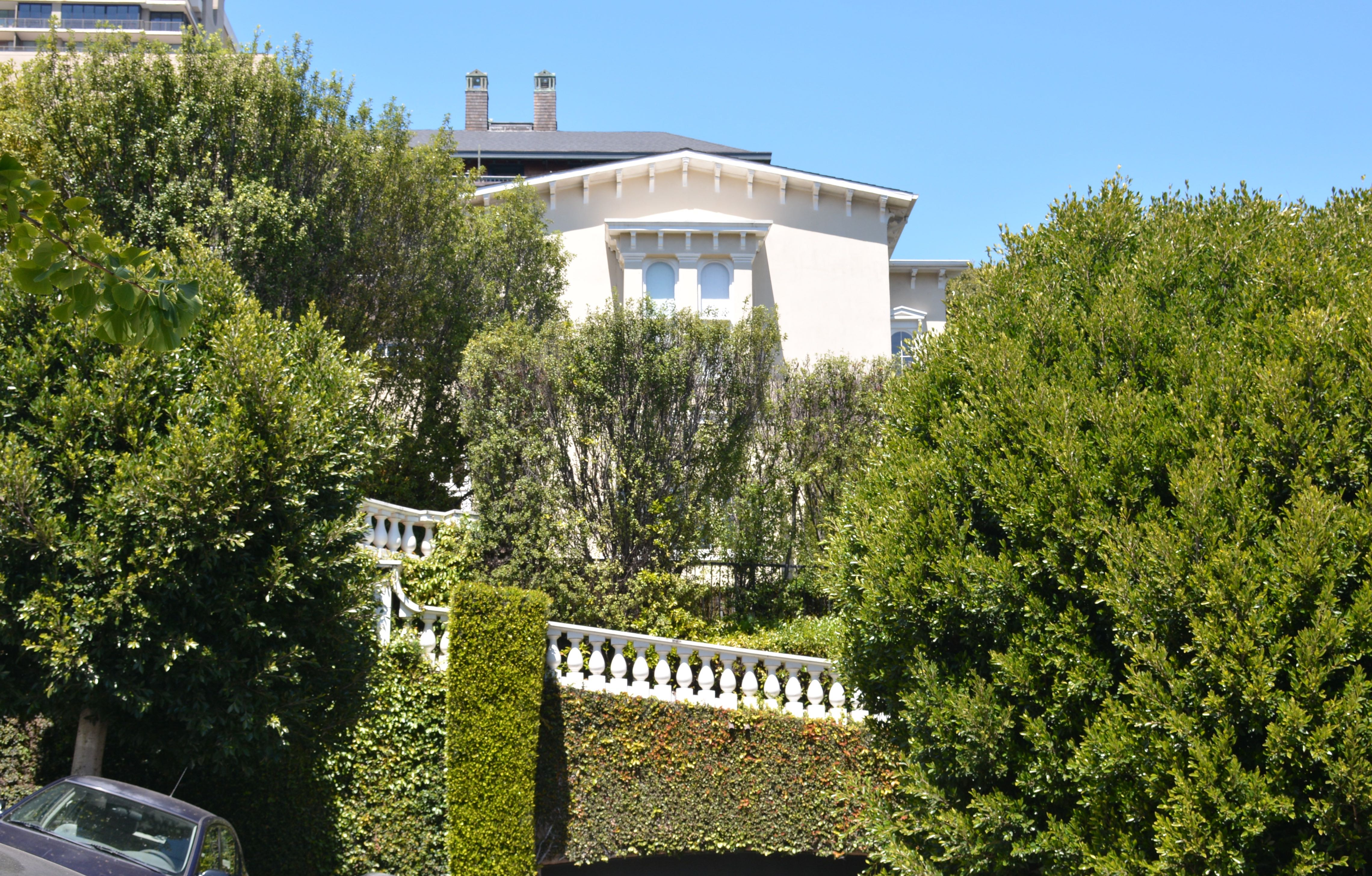
- Atkinson House in 2019
- Interactive map of Atkinson House
- Location: 1032 Broadway, San Francisco, California, U.S.

History
- Built: 1853; 173 years ago

Site notes
- Architect: William H. Ranlett
- Architectural style: Italianate
- Restored by: Willis Polk (1900)

San Francisco Designated Landmark
- Designated: July 17, 1977
- Reference no.: 97

The Atkinson House is a historic house built in 1853, and located in the Russian Hill area of San Francisco, California. It is one of the oldest residences in the city still standing (tied with the Tanforan Cottages), and possibly one of the first Italianate-style homes in the city. It is also known as the Katherine Atkinson House, and Atkinson-Escher House.

The Atkinson House has been listed as a San Francisco Designated Landmark since July 17, 1977. This building is part of the Vallejo Street Crest Historic District, which is listed as one of the National Register of Historic Places since January 22, 1988.

== History ==
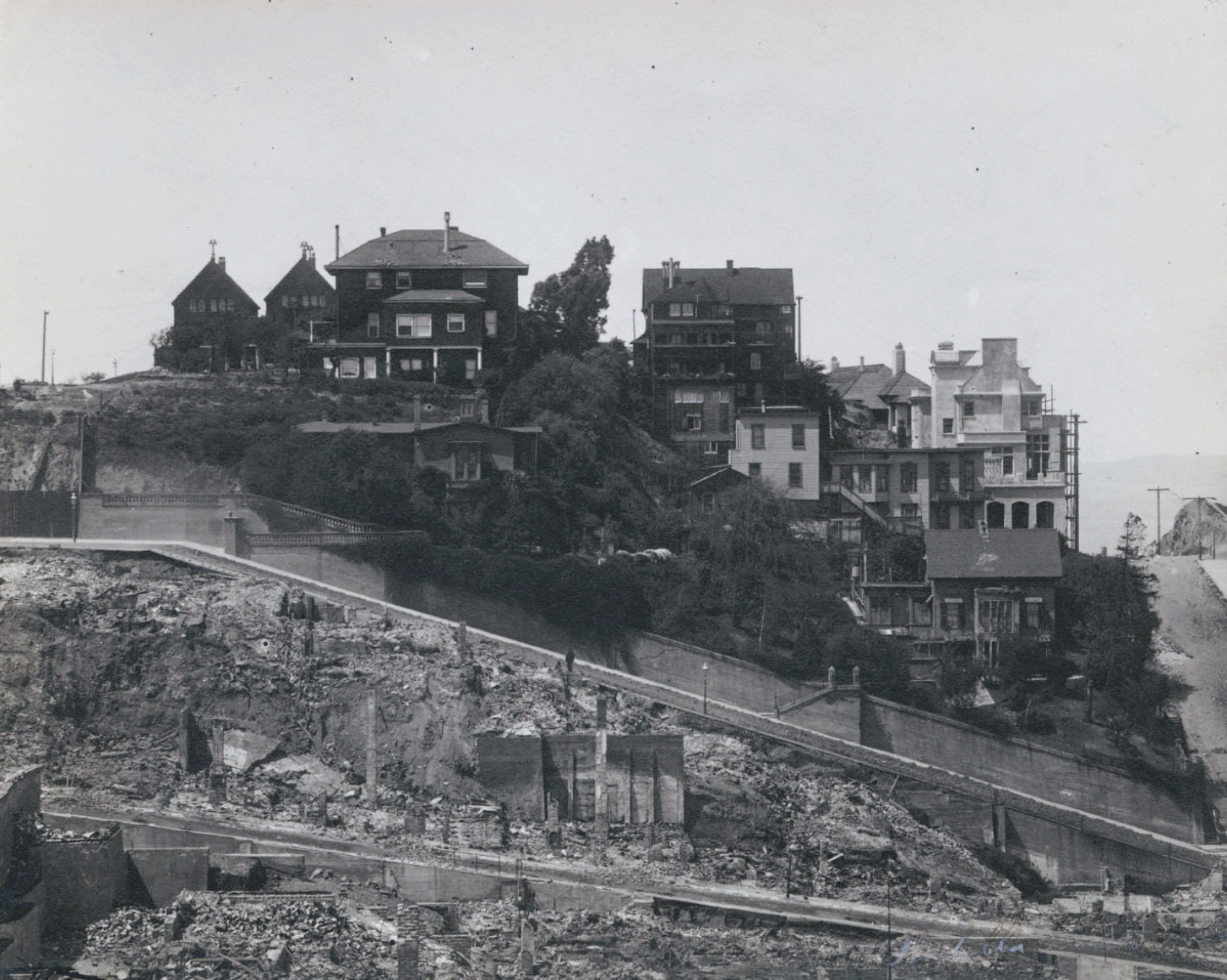
Atkinson House (towards the middle of image) after the 1906 San Francisco earthquake, on the Vallejo Street Crest

The Atkinson House is two-stories tall and located at 1032 Broadway in San Francisco, California. The house was walking distance to the Yerba Buena Cove, and was located on the top of a hill that originally had access via a zig-zagged foot path. A natural spring was located on the property, which had encouraged the growth of ferns and plants.

It was built in 1853 for Joseph H. Atkinson and his family; he was a brick contractor and a partial owner of the Lone Mountain Cemetery. The presumed architect of the Atkinson House is William H. Ranlett (or his architecture firm "Homer, Ranlett and Morrison"). Between 1853 and 1854, a partnership formed between Joseph H. Atkinson (brick contractor), Charles Homer (a general contractor on projects such as ), and William H. Ranlett (an architect) in order to design and build their own three houses in the area now known as the Vallejo Street Crest Historic District in the Russian Hill neighborhood of San Francisco. The Atkinson and Ranlett houses may have been the first Italianate-style homes in San Francisco.

Katherine "Kate" M. Atkinson (1845—1920), the daughter of Joseph, had inherited the house. She was an artist and the cousin of Gelett Burgess; around the 1890s the house was used as a meeting place for artists and bohemians (such as the 'Les Jeunes' group), and the site of occult practices and seances. In 1900, the home was remodeled by architect Willis Polk, of the firm Polk and Polk. During the Polk remodel, an iron fence with gate was added to the home. It survived the 1906 San Francisco earthquake and fire. At some point the exterior of the house was modified with stucco.

The residence remained in the Atkinson family until 1916, and it changed owners many times over the years. In 1931, the house had a fire in the upper floor and it was remodeled by designer Bruce Porter.

In 2015, the house was for sale, asking price US$12 million; it was 3890 square feet and featured four bedrooms and four and half bathrooms.

== See also ==
- List of San Francisco Designated Landmarks
