= Cadenasso =

Cadenasso is a surname. Notable people with the surname include:

- Gianluca Cadenasso (born 2004), Italian tennis player
- Giuseppe Cadenasso (1854/8–1918), Italian-born American painter
