= Vermont Street =

Vermont Street may refer to:

- Vermont Street (San Francisco), known for its twists and turns
- Blue Island/Vermont Street station, a railway station in Blue Island, Illinois, the US

== See also ==
- Vermont Avenue
