= William H. Ranlett =

American architect (1806–1865)

- Born: July 3, 1806; Augusta, Maine, U.S.
- Died: November 8, 1865 (aged 59); Hohokus, Bergen County, New Jersey, U.S.
- Occupation(s): Architect, author
- Organization(s): Homer, Ranlett and Morrison

William H. Ranlett Sr. (July 3, 1806 – November 8, 1865) was an American architect and author. He moved from the East Coast to San Francisco during the California Gold Rush and is thought to have brought Italianate-style architecture with him to the city. He was a partner in the architecture firm, "Homer, Ranlett and Morrison".

== History ==
Ranlett published the periodical, The Architect.

For two years between 1853 and 1854, Ranlett formed a partnership with Charles Homer (a general contractor), and Joseph H. Atkinson (a brick contractor) in order to design and build their own three houses (in the area now known as the Vallejo Street Crest Historic District) in the Russian Hill neighborhood of San Francisco. It is thought that Ranlett had brought Italianate-style architecture to the city; and both the Atkinson House (1853) and Ranlett House (1853) were the first Italianate style buildings in San Francisco.

By 1857, Ranlett went bankrupt, and he had returned to the East Coast.

Some of Ranlett's architectural designs were published in Godey's Lady's Book, the influential fashion guide.

== Works ==
- Tudor Hall (built 1847 to 1852), Bel Air, Maryland
- The Hermitage (remodeled 1847), Ho-Ho-Kus, New Jersey
- Cooleemee (built 1853 to 1855), Mocksville, North Carolina
- Colonel William Bratton House (same as? Hightower Hall, John Simpson Bratton House, York County Road 165, Brattonville Historic District, York County, South Carolina)
- William H. Ranlett House, Castleton, Staten Island, New York City, New York
- Robert D. Baskerville House, Mecklenburg County, Virginia; also known as Eureka
- Myron Pardee House (now Sigma Tau Chi Fraternity House), 8 Montcalm Street, Oswego, New York; also known as Lakeside
- Charles Homer House (1853; now demolished), roughly at 40 Florence Street, San Francisco, California
- Joseph H. Atkinson House (1853), 1032 Broadway, San Francisco, California
- William H. Ranlett House (1854), 1637 Taylor Street, San Francisco, California; also known as “The House of Many Corners”

== Publications ==
- William H. Ranlett, The Architect, Vol. I & II, New York: Dewitt & Davenport, 1847–1849. Reprint, New York: DaCapo Press, 1976.
