= Tudor Hall (Bel Air, Maryland) =

Historic house in Maryland, United States

- U.S. National Register of Historic Places
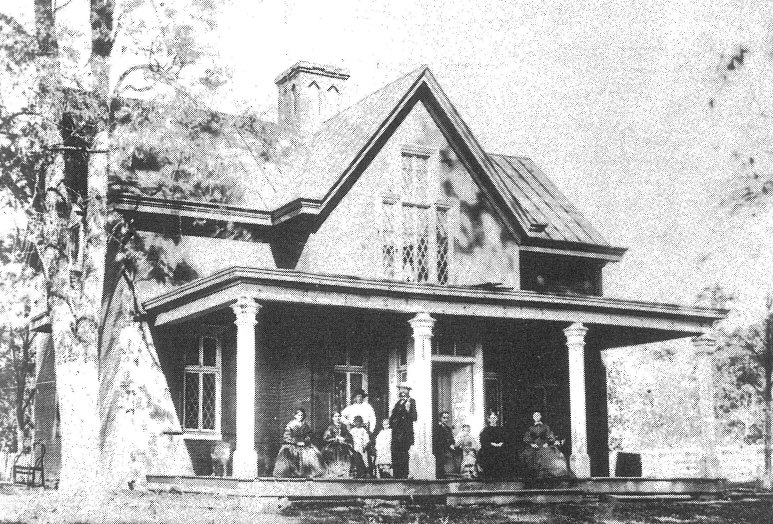
- Tudor Hall in 1865

- Location within Maryland Location within the United States
- Interactive map showing the location of Tudor Hall
- Location: Northeast of Bel Air off Maryland Route 22, Bel Air, Maryland
- Coordinates: 39°33′15″N 76°18′11″W
- Built: 1847–1852
- Architect: William H. Ranlett
- Architectural style: Gothic Revival
- NRHP reference No.: 73000924 and 82001595
- Added to NRHP: March 14, 1973 (original); December 16, 1982 (decrease)

Tudor Hall is a historic home located at Bel Air, Harford County, Maryland, United States. It is a 1 1/2-story Gothic Revival cottage built of painted brick. The house was built as a country retreat by Junius Brutus Booth (1796–1852) from Plates 44 and 45, Design XVII, of The Architect, by William H. Ranlett, 1847. However, Booth never lived in Tudor Hall, because he died before it was completed. His son Edwin Booth lived there only briefly on his return from California before he moved the family back into Baltimore. But his other son, John Wilkes Booth, lived there with his mother, brother Joseph, and two sisters from December 1852 through most of 1856.

After the family moved out, they rented the home to the King family and later sold it to Sam Kyle and Ella Mahoney. She lived in Tudor Hall for 70 years and opened a museum. After her death the house passed through a succession of owners, including the Worthington family, who owned the Aegis newspaper. Finally the house was sold to the Foxes, who reopened Mahoney's museum.

Tudor Hall was listed on the National Register of Historic Places in 1973. A modification to its listing, to decrease its boundaries, was registered in 1982. After the Preservation Association of Tudor Hall (PATH) collapsed, Tudor Hall was sold to the Bakers and later to Harford County, who are now in possession of the historic home.

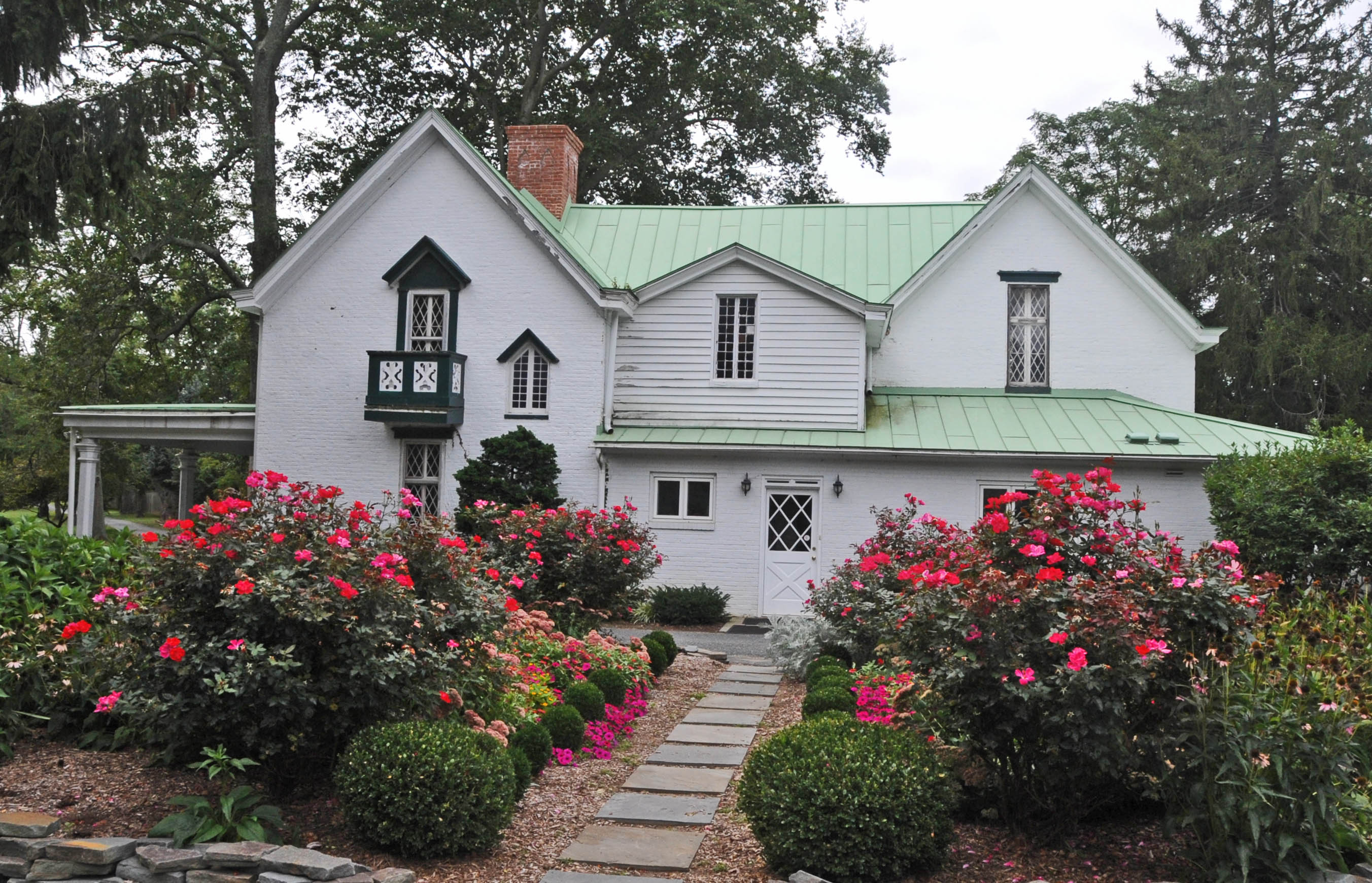
View from the side

The house is currently the home of the Junius B. Booth Society, a group of volunteers dedicated to the preservation and interpretation of the historic home. Tudor Hall is open for tours on select Sundays from April until November and during special events hosted by the Society.

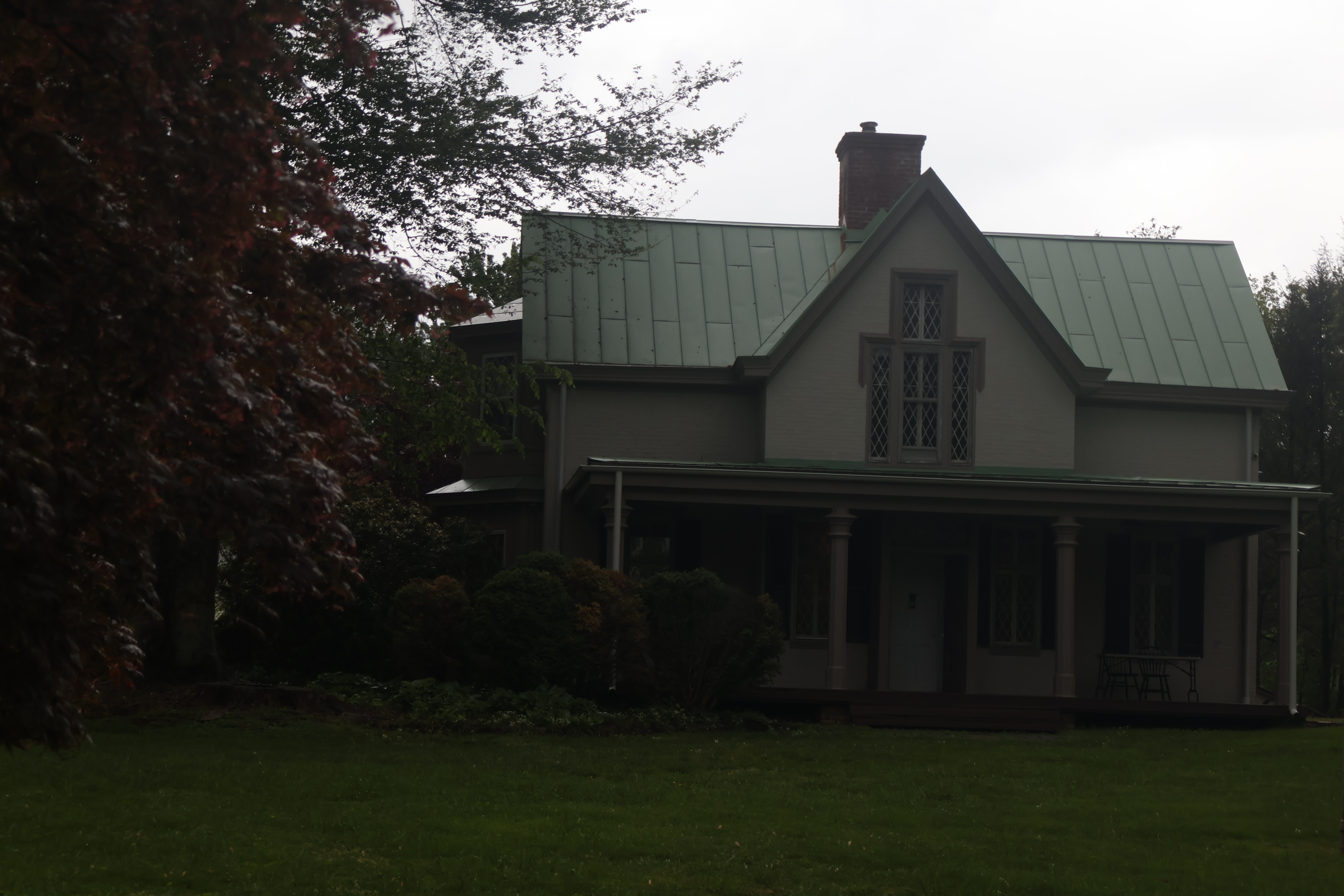
Main building of Tudor Hall, Bel Air, Maryland, US, Late May 2025

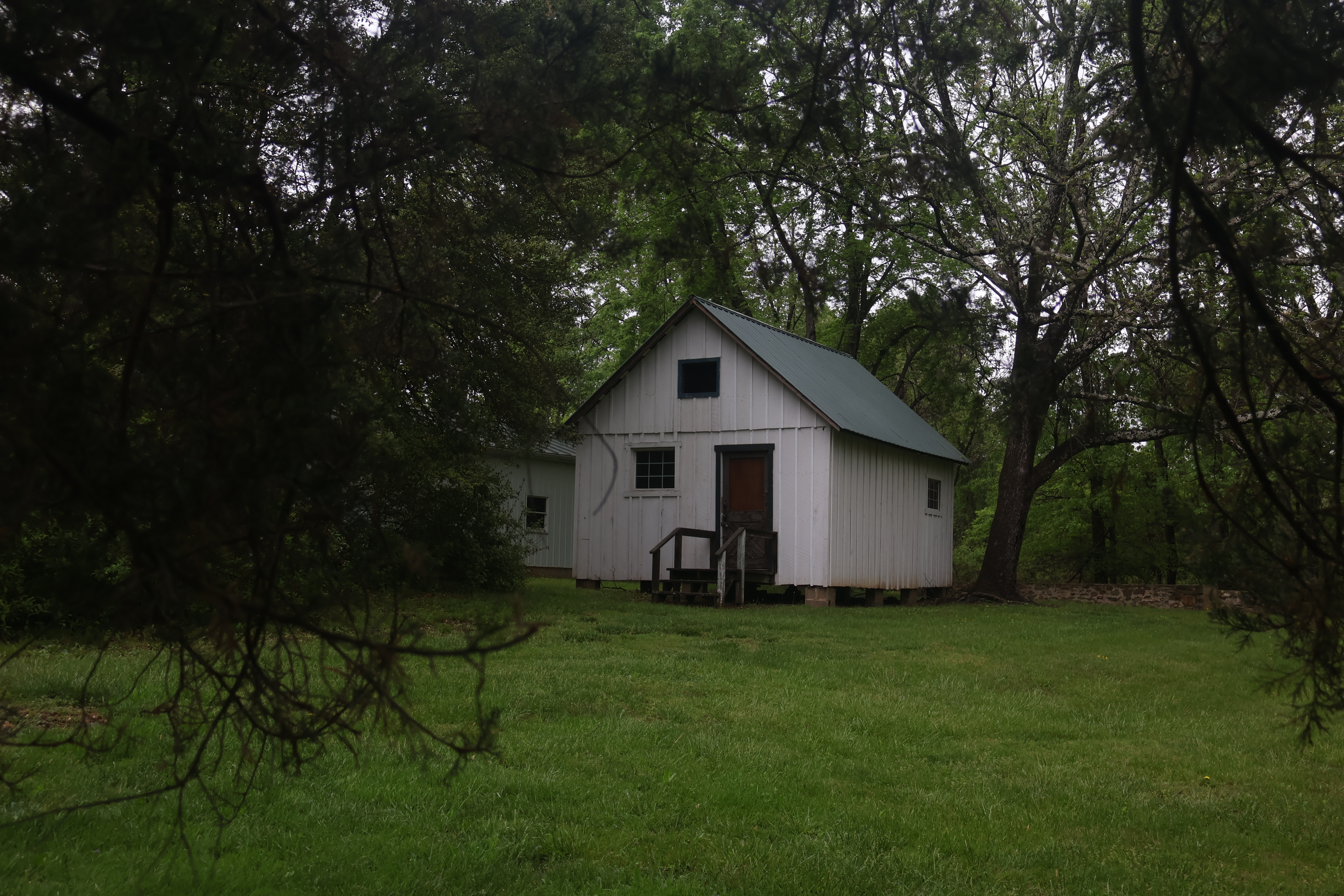
Outbuilding of Tudor Hall, Bel Air, Maryland, US, Late May 2025

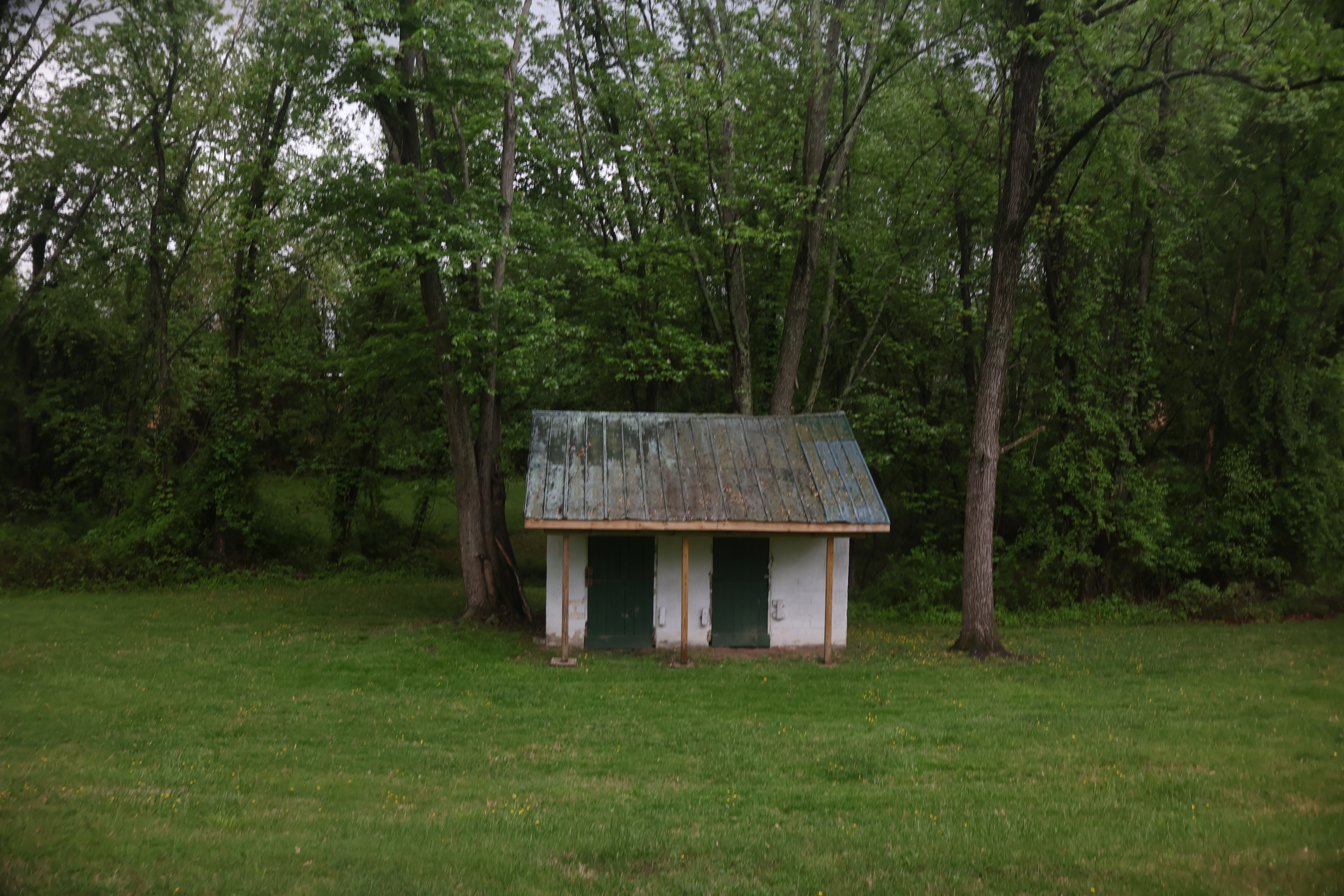
Shed of Tudor Hall, Bel Air, Maryland, US, Late May 2025

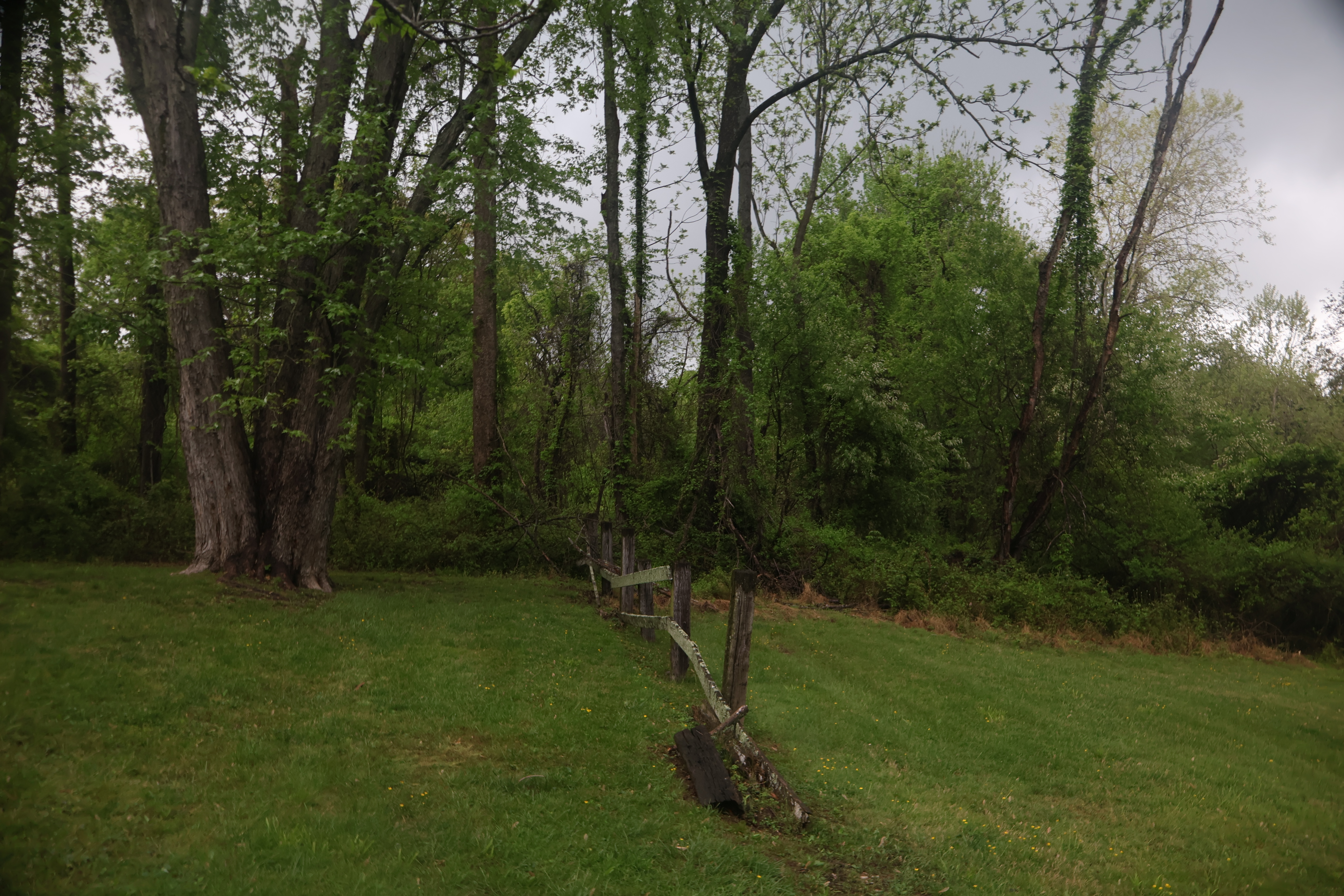
Grounds of Tudor Hall, Bel Air, Maryland, US, Late May 2025

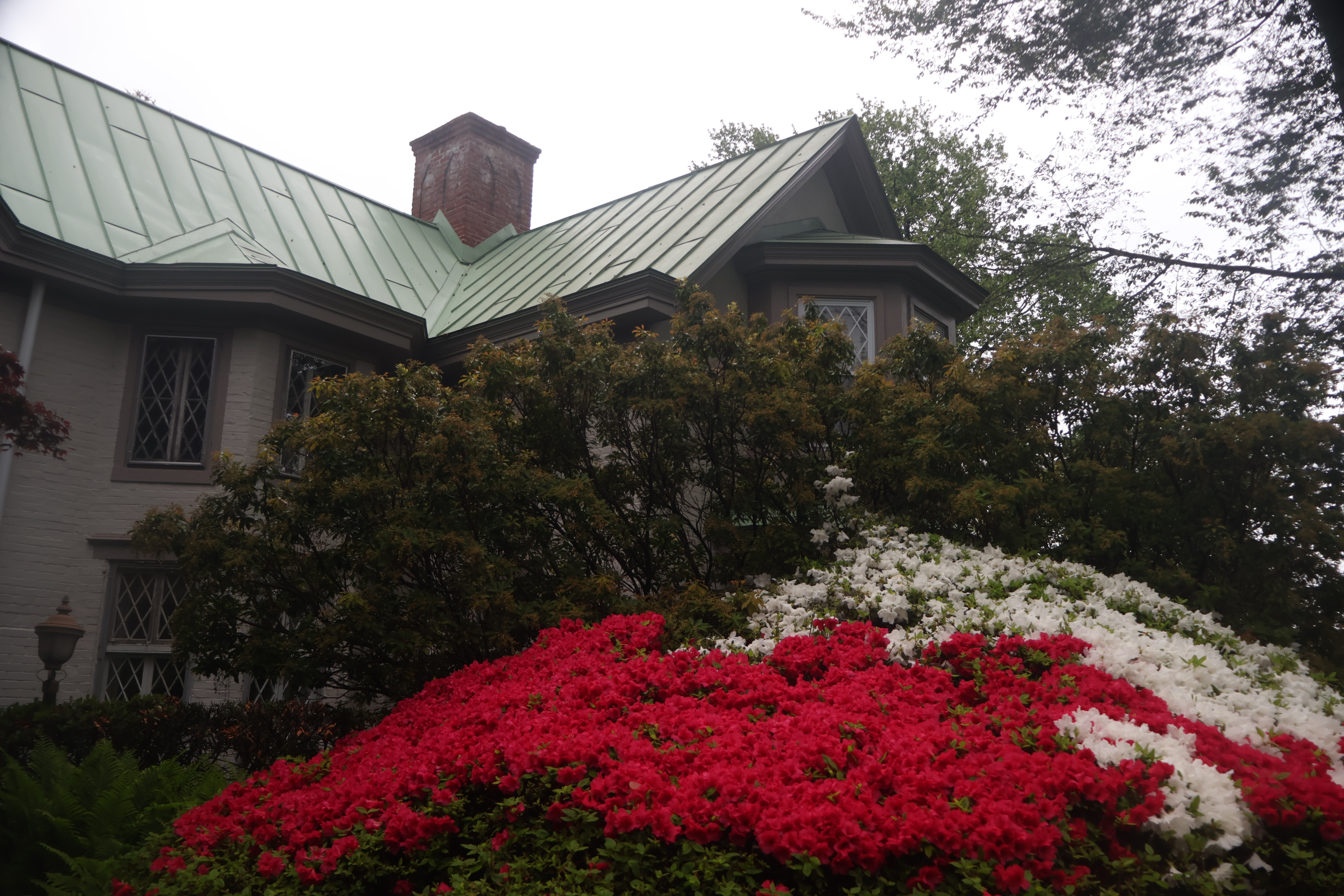
Main building and garden of Tudor Hall, Bel Air, Maryland, US, Late May 2025
