= Lombard Street (San Francisco) =

Street in San Francisco, California

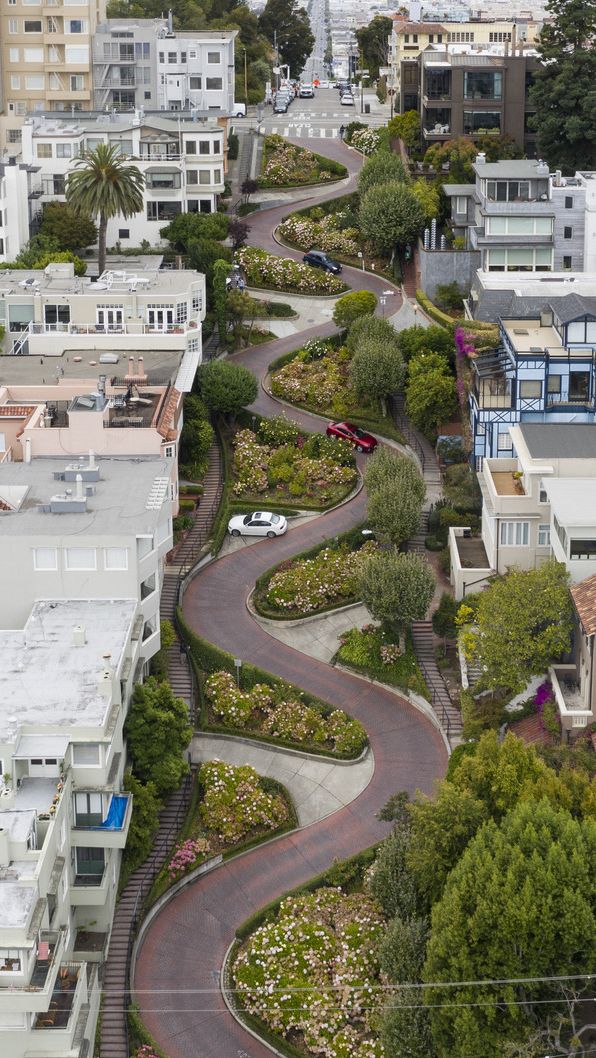
- Lombard Street in 2020
- Interactive map of Lombard Street
- Part of: US 101 between Richardson Avenue/Broderick Street and Van Ness Avenue
- Namesake: Philadelphia's Lombard Street
- Maintained by: San Francisco DPW; Caltrans (US 101 portion)
- Coordinates: 37°48′07″N 122°25′08″W (Note: Coordinates mark "the crookedest street in the world" segment)
- West end: Presidio Boulevard
- Major junctions: US 101; Fillmore Street; US 101; Columbus Avenue; Telegraph Hill Boulevard; Gap in route; Montgomery Street
- East end: The Embarcadero

Lombard Street is an east–west street in San Francisco, California, that has a steep, one-block section with eight hairpin turns. The street stretches from The Presidio east to The Embarcadero (with a gap on Telegraph Hill). Most of Lombard Street's western segment is a major thoroughfare designated as part of U.S. Route 101. The one-block section, claimed to be "the crookedest street in the world", is located along the eastern segment in the Russian Hill neighborhood. It is a major tourist attraction, receiving around two million visitors per year and up to 17,000 per day on busy summer weekends, as of 2015.

San Francisco surveyor Jasper O'Farrell named the road after Lombard Street in Philadelphia.

== Route description ==
Lombard Street's west end is at Presidio Boulevard inside the Presidio; it then heads east through the Cow Hollow neighborhood. For 12 blocks, between Broderick Street and Van Ness Avenue, it is an arterial road that is co-signed as U.S. Route 101. Lombard Street continues through the Russian Hill neighborhood and to the Telegraph Hill neighborhood. At Telegraph Hill it turns south, becoming Telegraph Hill Boulevard to Pioneer Park and Coit Tower. Lombard Street starts again at Winthrop Street and ends at The Embarcadero as a collector road.

A one-way block on Russian Hill between Hyde and Leavenworth streets has eight sharp turns, which are said to make it the most crooked street in the world. The design, first suggested by property owner Carl Henry and built in 1922, was intended to reduce the hill's natural 27 percent grade, which was too steep for most vehicles. The crooked block is about 600 feet (180 m) long (412.5 feet (125.7 m) straight line), is one-way (downhill) and is paved with red bricks. The sign at the top recommends 5 mph (8 km/h).

The segment normally sees around 250 vehicles per hour, with average daily traffic reaching 2,630 vehicles in 2013. During peak times, vehicles have to wait up to 20 minutes to enter the Crooked Street segment, in a queue that can reach Van Ness Avenue.

The Powell-Hyde cable car stops at the top of the block on Hyde Street.

By 2017, the area around the curved segment had become a hot-spot of what has been described as "San Francisco's car break-in epidemic." This may in part have been due to its heavy traffic and association with tourism.

The Academy of Art University owns and operates a building called Star Hall on the street for housing purposes.

Past residents of Lombard Street include Rowena Meeks Abdy, an early California painter who worked in the style of Impressionism.

Chase and race scenes in many films have been filmed on the street, including Good Neighbor Sam, Dr. Goldfoot and the Bikini Machine, The Love Bug, What's Up, Doc?, and Ant-Man and the Wasp. Lombard Street is also portrayed in the 2015 Pixar film Inside Out, and is referenced by Bill Cosby on his 1965 comedy album Why Is There Air?.

== Major intersections ==
The entire route is in San Francisco.

mi	km	Destinations	Notes
		Presidio Boulevard	West end of Lombard Street
		US 101 north (Richardson Avenue) / Broderick Street	West end of US 101 overlap
		Fillmore Street	
		Octavia Street	
		US 101 south (Van Ness Avenue)	East end of US 101 overlap
		Polk Street	
		Hyde Street	
		The crookedest street in the world segment	
		Leavenworth Street	
		Columbus Avenue	
		Powell Street	
		Stockton Street	
		Grant Avenue	
		Telegraph Hill Boulevard / Kearny Street	
Gap in route
		Montgomery Street	
		Embarcadero	East end of Lombard Street
1.000 mi = 1.609 km; 1.000 km = 0.621 mi: Concurrency terminus

== Gallery ==
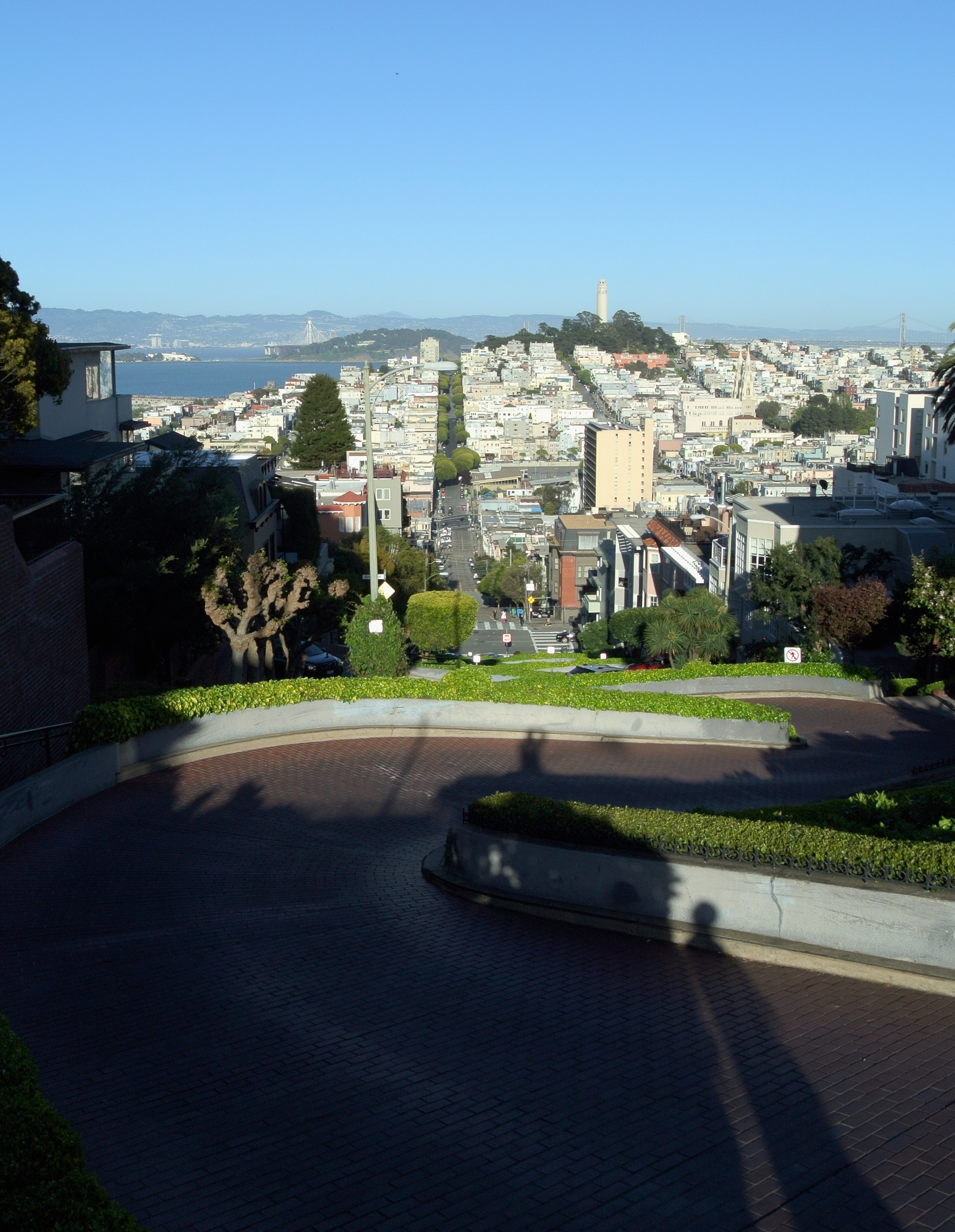
Looking east down the curvy block of Lombard Street, with the straight section continuing towards Telegraph Hill and Coit Tower

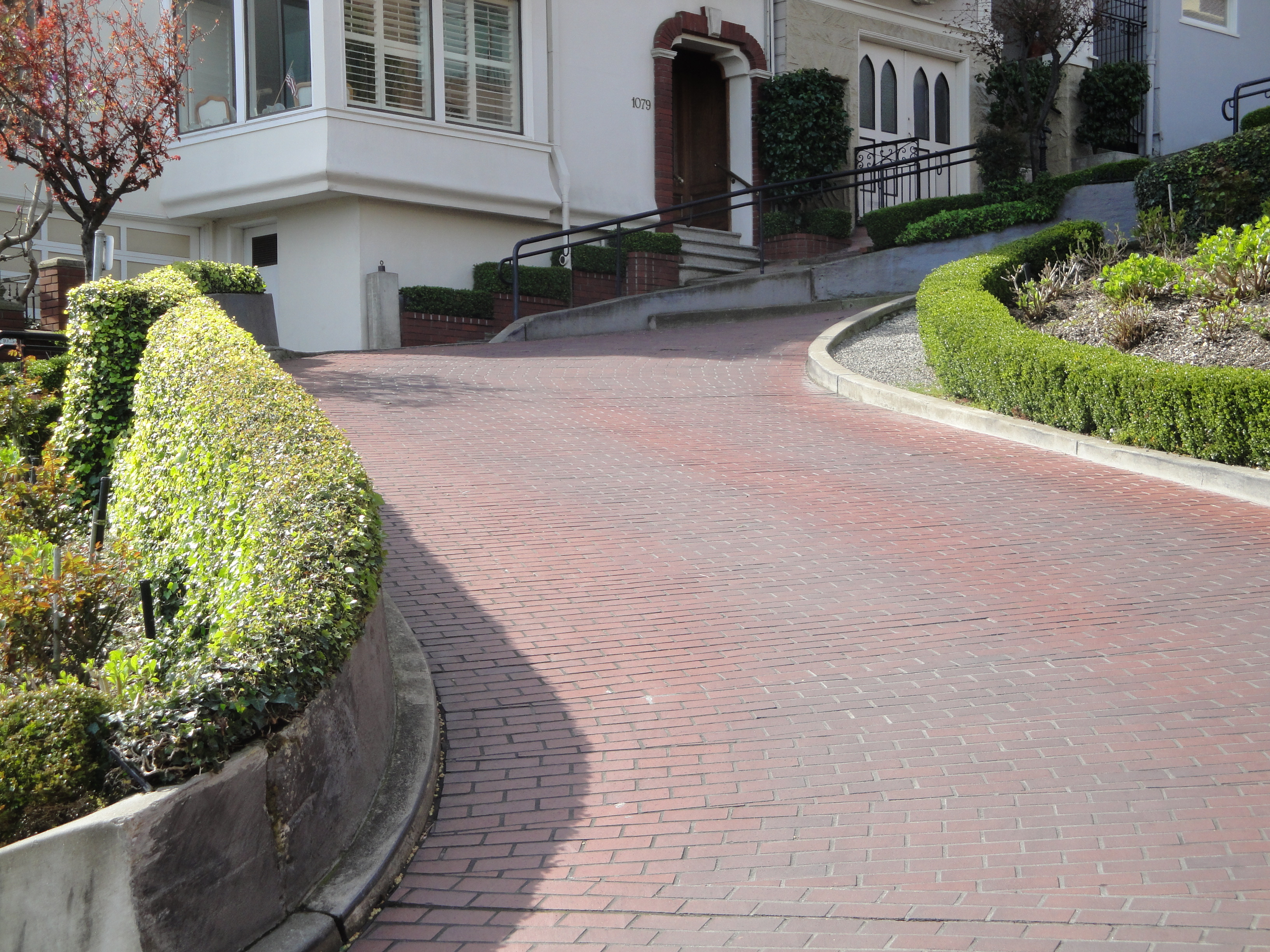
Looking up Lombard Street

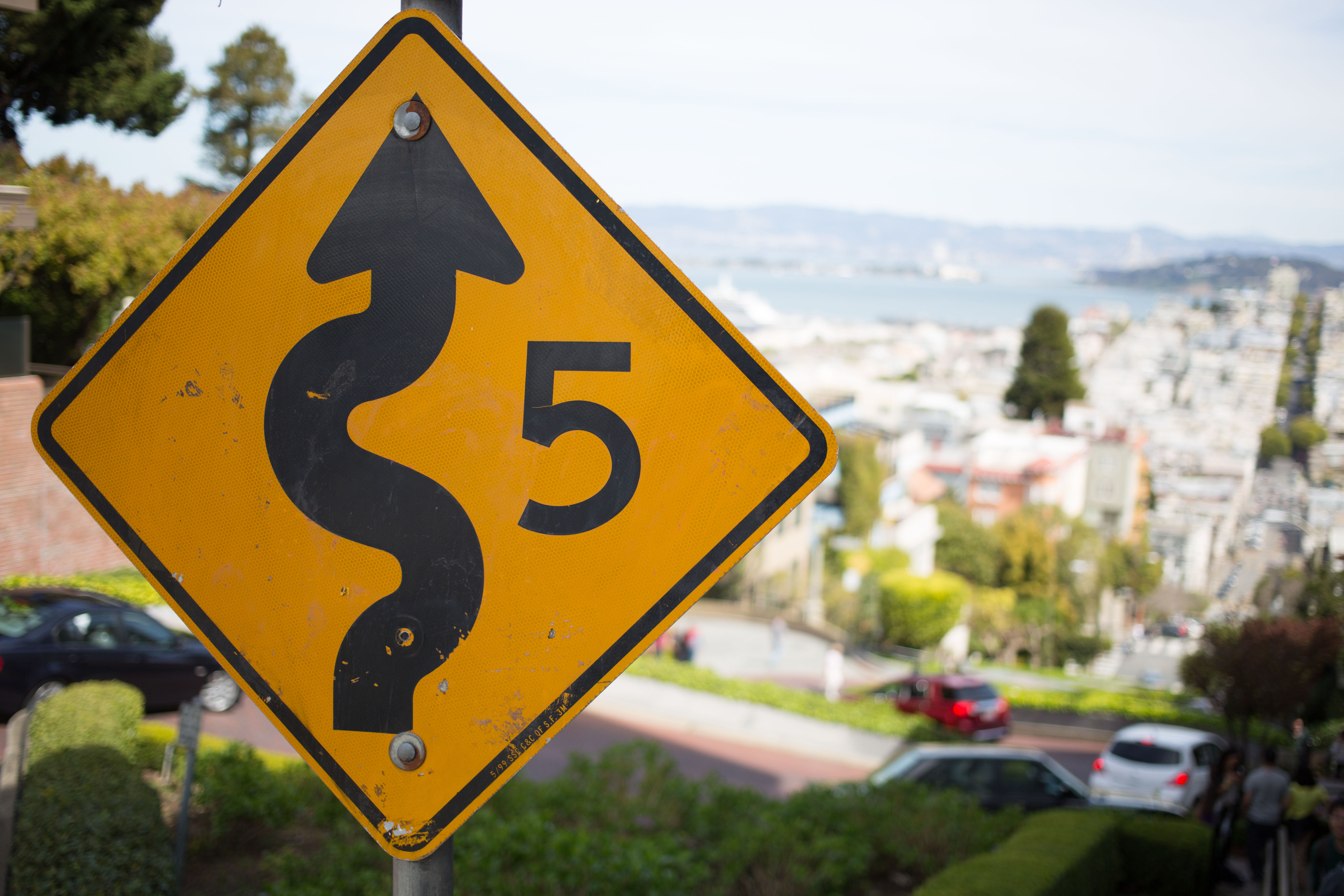
Traffic caution sign at top of switchbacks recommends a top speed of 5 miles per hour (8.0 km/h)

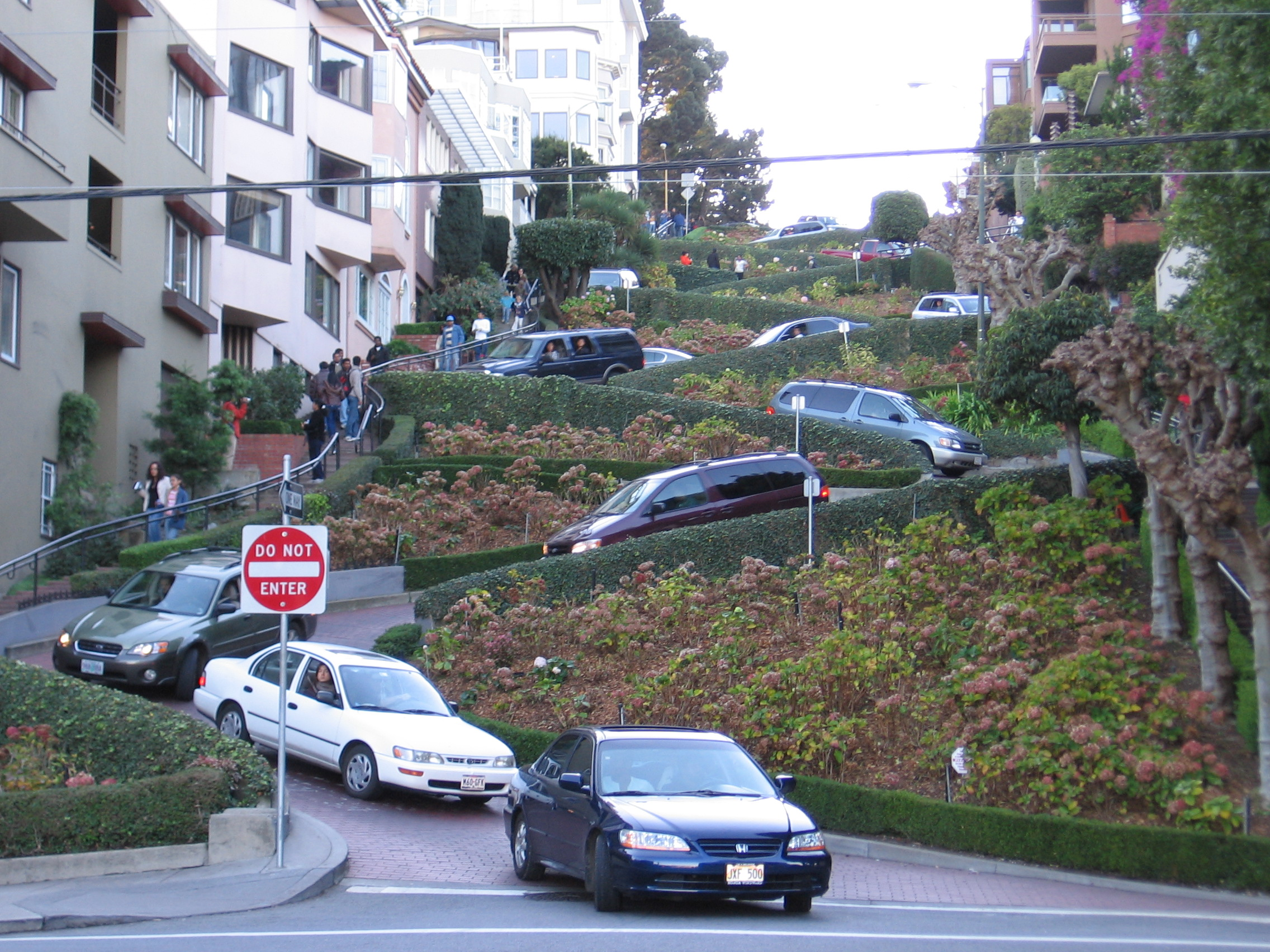
Cars exit from lowest switchback section

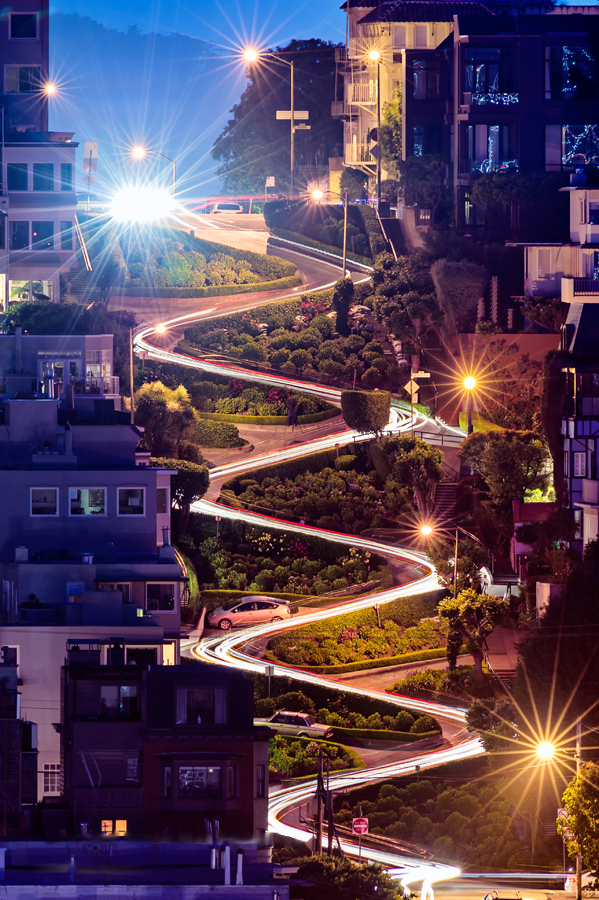
Time-exposure photo at night clearly shows the eight switchbacks

== See also ==
- Vermont Street, the other San Francisco street claimed to be the "most crooked". It has seven turns instead of eight, but its hill is steeper than Lombard's.
- Snake Alley in Burlington, Iowa, once recognized by Ripley's Believe It or Not! as "The Crookedest Street in the World". Like Lombard Street, it has eight turns but over a shorter distance.
