= Russian Hill-Vallejo Street Crest District =

- U.S. National Register of Historic Places
- U.S. Historic district
- California Historical Landmark
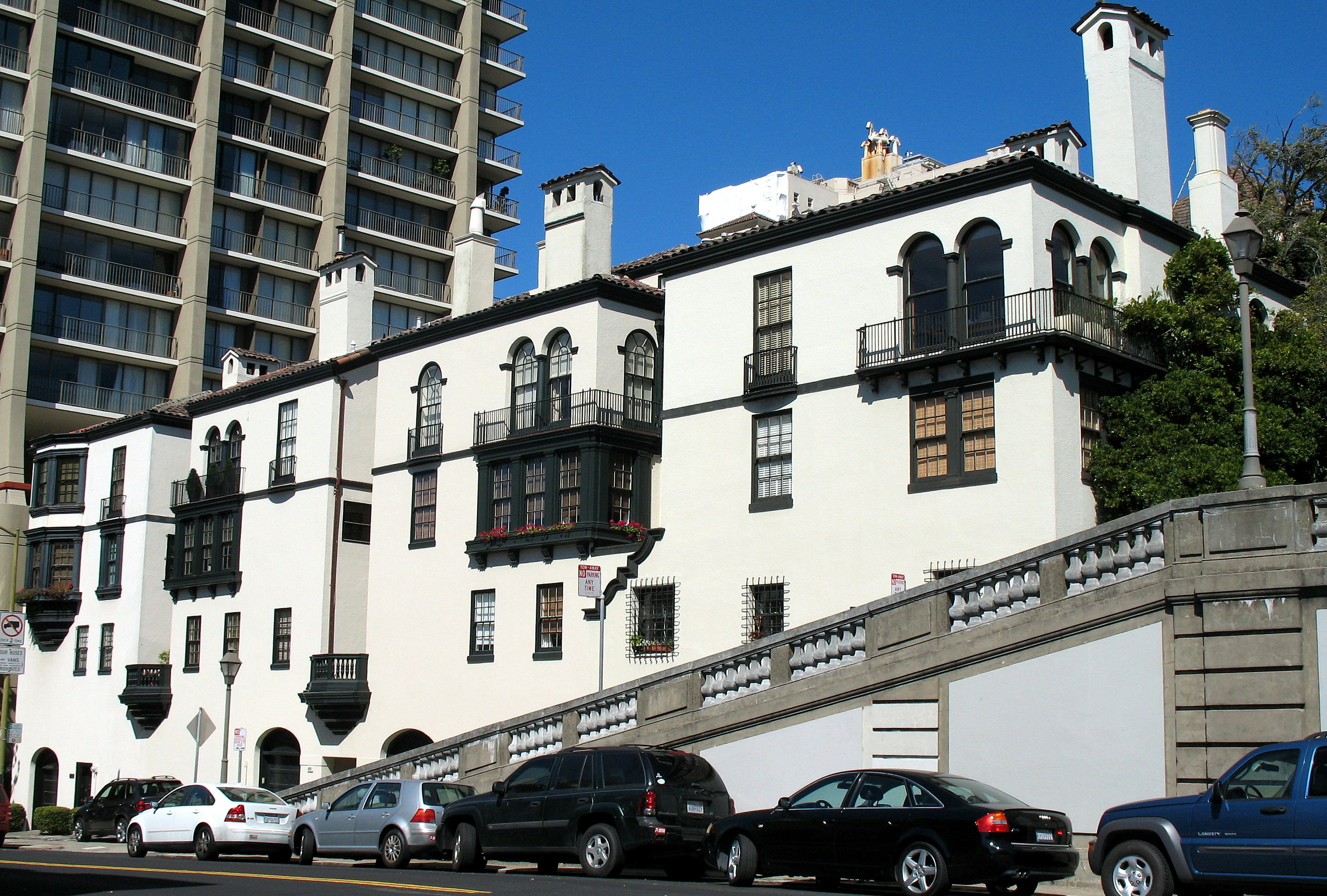

- Location within San Francisco County Location within California Location within the United States
- Location: Roughly 1020-1032 Broadway, 1-49 Florence, 1728-1742 Jones, 1-7 Russian Hill Pl., 1629-1715 Taylor, & 1000-1085 Vallejo, San Francisco, California, U.S.
- Coordinates: 37°47′52″N 122°24′48″W
- Area: 4 acres (1.6 ha)
- Architect: Willis Polk
- Architectural style: Late 19th And 20th Century Revivals, Italianate, Pueblo/Mission Revival
- NRHP reference No.: 87002289
- CHISL No.: N1549

Significant dates
- Added to NRHP: January 22, 1988
- Designated CHISL: January 22, 1988

Russian Hill-Vallejo Street Crest District is a 4-acre (1.6 ha) historic district in Russian Hill, San Francisco, California, that was listed on the National Register of Historic Places on January 22, 1988, for the people, events and architecture. The area is a residential enclave defined by retaining walls and natural bluff.

== About ==
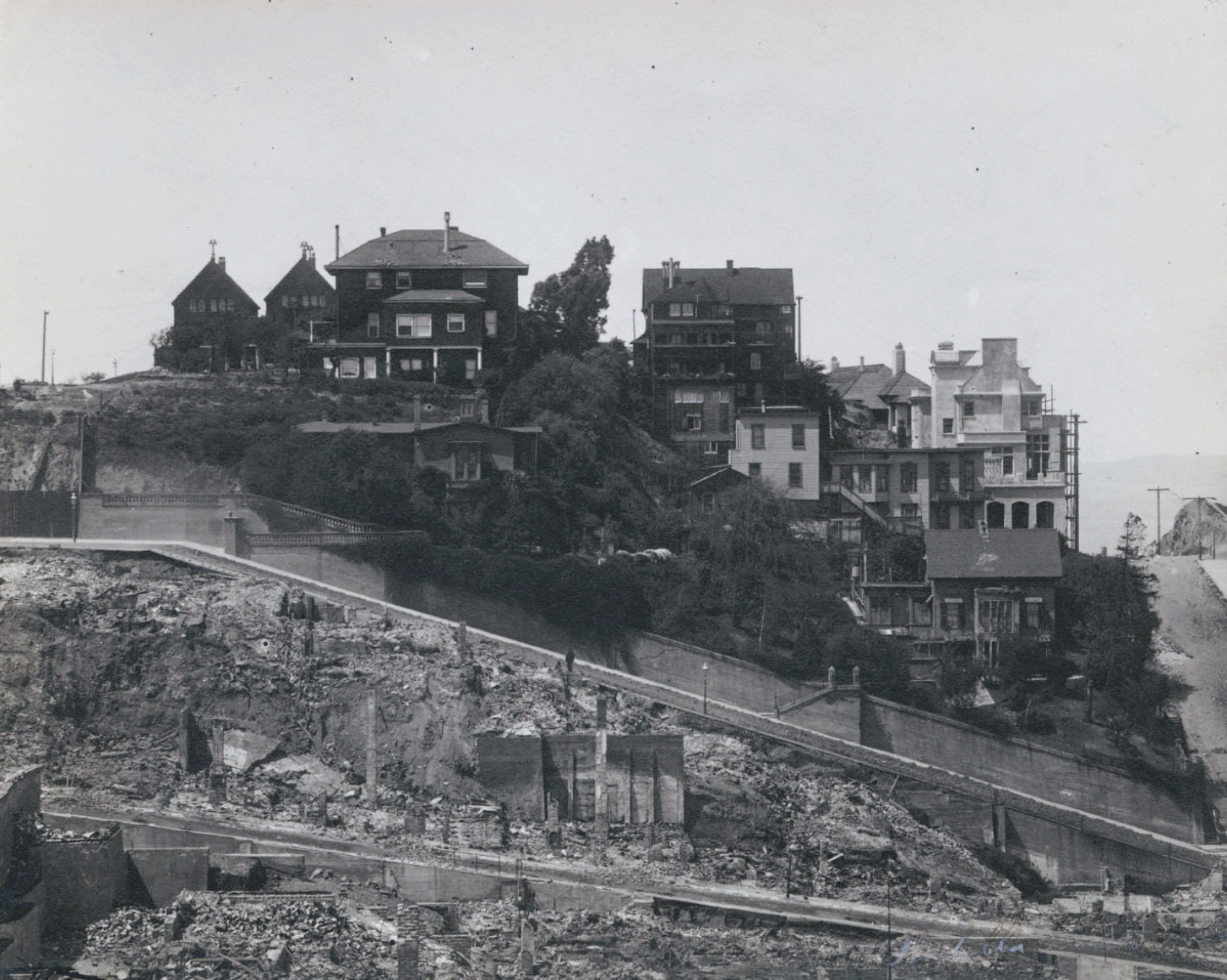
Vallejo Street Crest in Russian Hill, 1906 after the earthquake

The area is roughly bound by 1020-1032 Broadway, 1-49 Florence Street, 1728-1742 Jones Street, 1-7 Russian Hill Place, 1629-1715 Taylor Street, and 1000-1085 Vallejo Street, in San Francisco, California, U.S. The listing included 27 contributing buildings, 2 contributing sites, and 5 contributing structures. This historic district had survived the 1906 San Francisco earthquake and fire.

This district has architectural works by Willis Polk, Charles F. Whittlesey, Julia Morgan, Albert Farr, Charles W. McCall, and one of the only surviving works of amateur architect Joseph Worcester. Historic houses in the district include the Atkinson House (1853).

Notable former residents of this neighborhood include Katherine Atkinson, Maynard Dixon, Sara Bard Field, Dorothea Lange, Rose Wilder Lane, Horatio P. Livermore, Willis Polk, Mary Curtis Richardson, Dora Norton Williams, and Joseph Worcester.

Other historic districts in Russian Hill include the Russian Hill–Macondray Lane District and the Russian Hill-Paris Block Architectural District.

== See also ==
- National Register of Historic Places listings in San Francisco, California
