= Vermont Street (San Francisco) =

Street in San Francisco

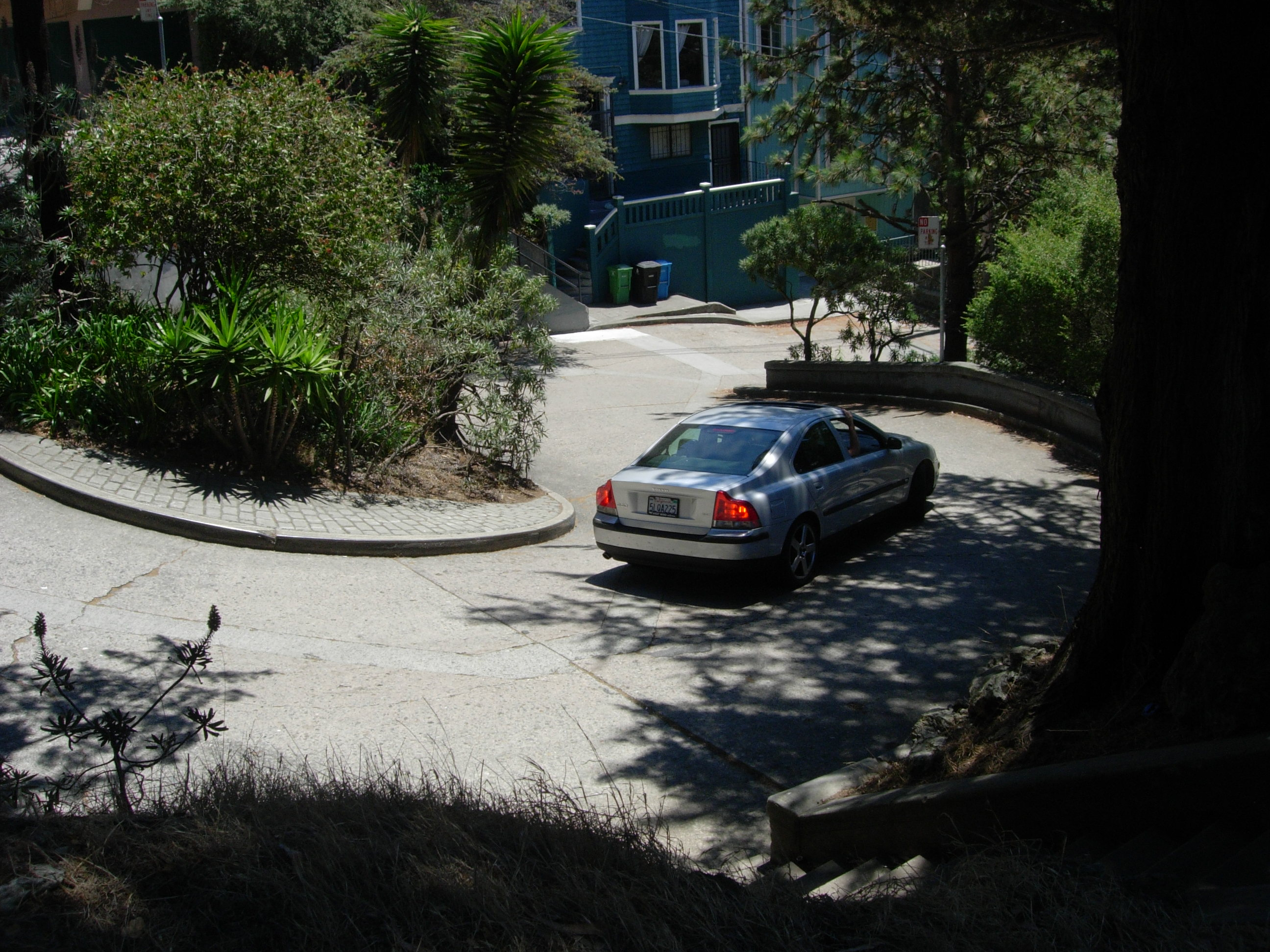
- Vermont Street
- Location: San Francisco, California
- South end: US 101 / Cesar Chavez Street in Produce Market
- North end: US 101 / Division Street at the Design District

Vermont Street is a north–south street in the Potrero Hill district of San Francisco, one of a series of streets in the Potrero Hill district named after American battleships. It begins at Division Street near the South of Market area and runs south, paralleling the U.S. 101 freeway. At 22nd Street Vermont Street jumps to the other side of the freeway via a pedestrian bridge. That piece ends at 25th Street; Vermont resumes at 26th Street back on the east side of the freeway and continues to its south end at Cesar Chavez Street.

== Background ==
Between 20th and 22nd Street, near McKinley Square, the street has seven sharp turns. This has led the street to be dubbed the crookedest in the world in competition with the better-known Lombard Street (Vermont, while steeper than Lombard, has fewer turns). In an episode of Fact or Fiction on the Travel Channel, Jayms Ramirez measured the sinuosity of Lombard and Vermont streets and found that Vermont is indeed more crooked (with a sinuosity of 1.56 versus 1.2 for Lombard Street). This is also backed up by various members of San Francisco's Department of Public Works on California's Gold episode "Crookedest Street" (#13011).

Unlike the famous block of Lombard Street, which is paved with red brick, Vermont Street is paved with concrete. Vermont Street runs parallel to and overlooks U.S. Route 101.

Vermont Street is featured in a chase scene in the Clint Eastwood movie Magnum Force (1973).
