= Mary Curtis Richardson =

American artist (1848–1931)

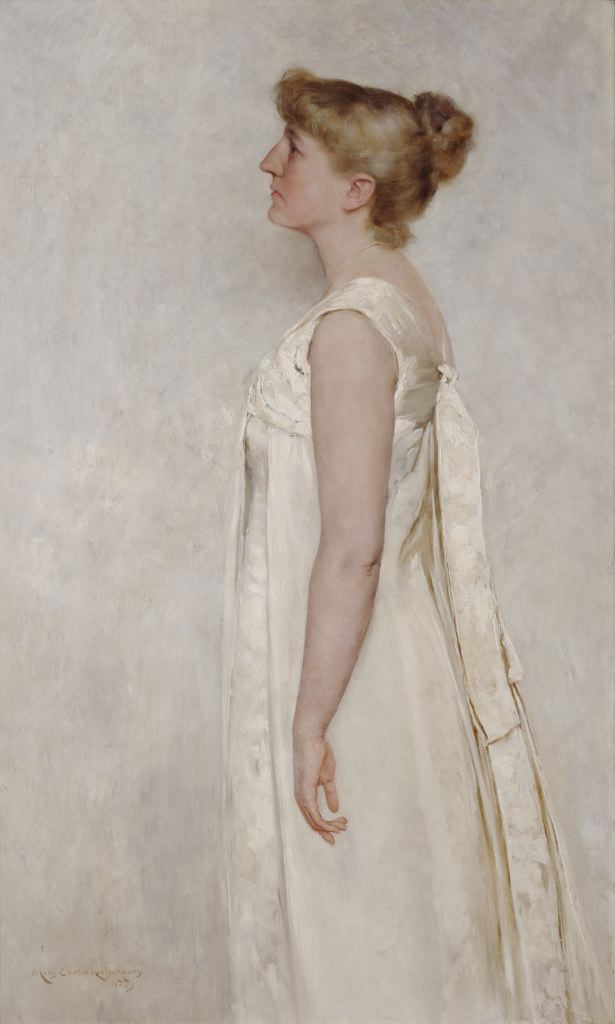
- Portrait of Mary Blanche Hubbard, 1889
- Born: April 9, 1848; New York City, U.S.
- Died: November 1, 1931 (aged 83); San Francisco, California, U.S.
- Known for: Painting
- Notable work: The Sleeping Child, The Young Mother
- Movement: Impressionism
- Spouse: Thomas Richardson

Mary Curtis Richardson (9 April 1848 in New York City – 1 November 1931 in San Francisco) was an impressionist painter and known as the "Mary Cassatt of the West". Her father, Lucien Curtis travelled by ship via Panama to the gold fields of California in 1849. The following year, Mary, her brother Joseph, her sister Leila, her mother Coelia and widowed grandmother Mary Day Perkins also went to California via the Isthmus of Panama to join her father in Sacramento, where he was the first town clerk. They soon moved on to Vallejo, then Petaluma, Oakland and finally San Francisco.

Her maternal grandfather was Joseph Perkins, a professional engraver in New York. At age 18, Mary and her sister Leila went to New York City and studied at Cooper Union for two years. She returned to San Francisco and helped to set up the [San Francisco Art Institute|School of Design]. In 1869, she married Thomas Richardson who came to San Francisco from Canada and was in the lumber business. He died in 1913. Mary and her sister Leila established a wood engraving studio. Mary began exploring portrait painting, and friends encouraged her to seriously take up painting full-time.

An impressionist, she is probably best known for her portrait paintings with a mother-and-child theme. One of her highly praised paintings, "The Sleeping Child" was eventually acquired by the Legion of Honor. Another child subject, "The Young Mother" won a silver medal at the Panama–Pacific International Exposition (1915).

Her other portrait work included that of David Starr Jordan (first president of Stanford University), Susan Tolman (Mrs. Cyrus) Mills, (co-founder of Mills College) and University of California language professor F. V. Paget.

Richardson was a member of the Worcester Group in the 1890s, which met regularly for informal discussions and to socialize under the leadership of Reverend Joseph Worcester (also an amateur architect). Mary lived next door on Vallejo Street in Russian Hill. Included in this group were artists such as William Keith and Bruce Porter, architects Willis Polk, Ernest Coxhead, John Galen Howard, Charles Keeler and writer Gelett Burgess.

Mary Curtis Richardson died 1 November 1931 at her Russian Hill studio and home.

== Works – partial list ==
- Stephen Leach
- Woman in Green
- David Atkins
- Lloyd Tevis
- The Dunes, Carmel
- Child and Kitten
- Child Reading
- Children with Donkey
- Children Hand in Hand
- Studies of a Baby
- Chapel Bells of Camulos -Ramona's House
- Robert Daniel Byrne
- Sarah Esther Chase Bourn In the collection of the Filoli Historic Estate, Woodside, CA
