= Macondray Lane =

Walking path in Russian Hill, San Francisco

Coordinates: 37.799203°N 122.415116°W

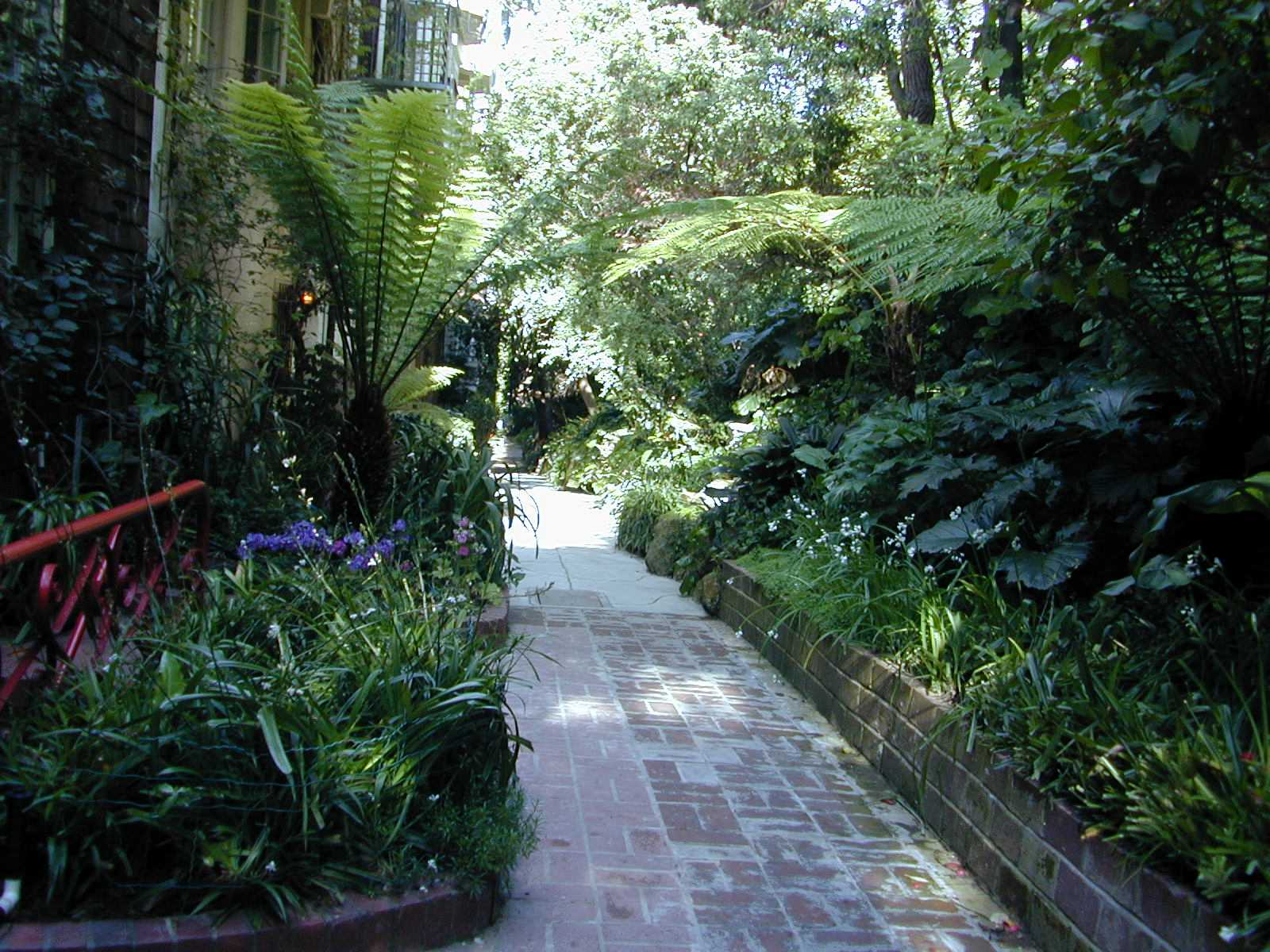
- The lane
- Location: San Francisco, California

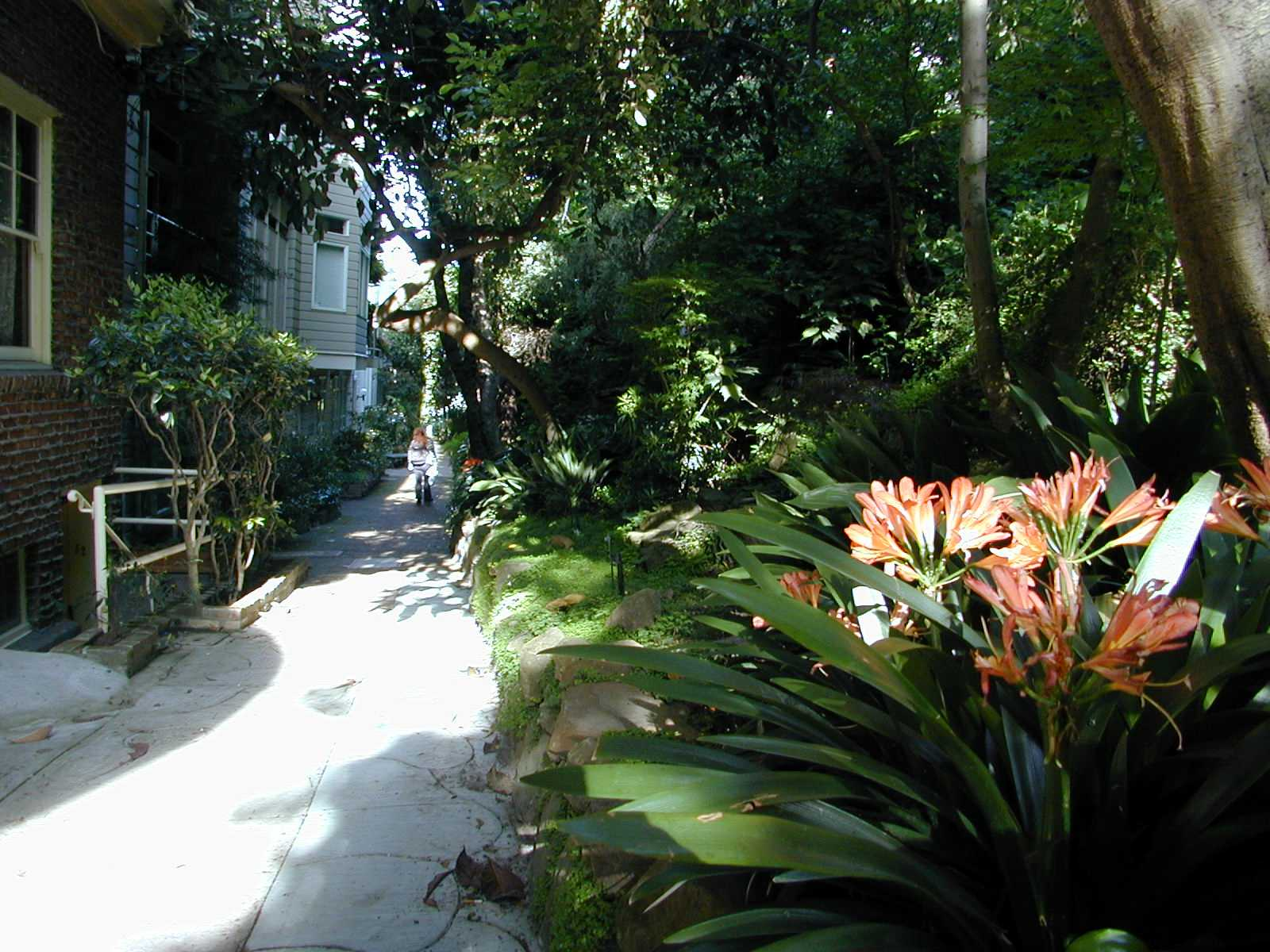
Farther east along the lane

Macondray Lane is a small pedestrian lane on the southeastern side of Russian Hill in San Francisco, California. It forms a wooded enclave that was added to the National Register of Historic Places in 1988 as the Russian Hill–Macondray Lane District.

Macondray Lane extends two blocks east–west between Leavenworth and Taylor Streets, paralleling Union and Green Streets. At the Taylor Street end, a set of wooden steps descend from the lane to Taylor Street. Views from the lane extend northward to Alcatraz Island and the San Francisco Bay.

In the 2017 Netflix documentary "The Untold Tales of Armistead Maupin," Maupin confirms that Macondray Lane was the inspiration for "Barbary Lane" in Armistead Maupin's Tales of the City, as previously reported.
