= Giuseppe Cadenasso =

Italian-born American painter (died 1918)

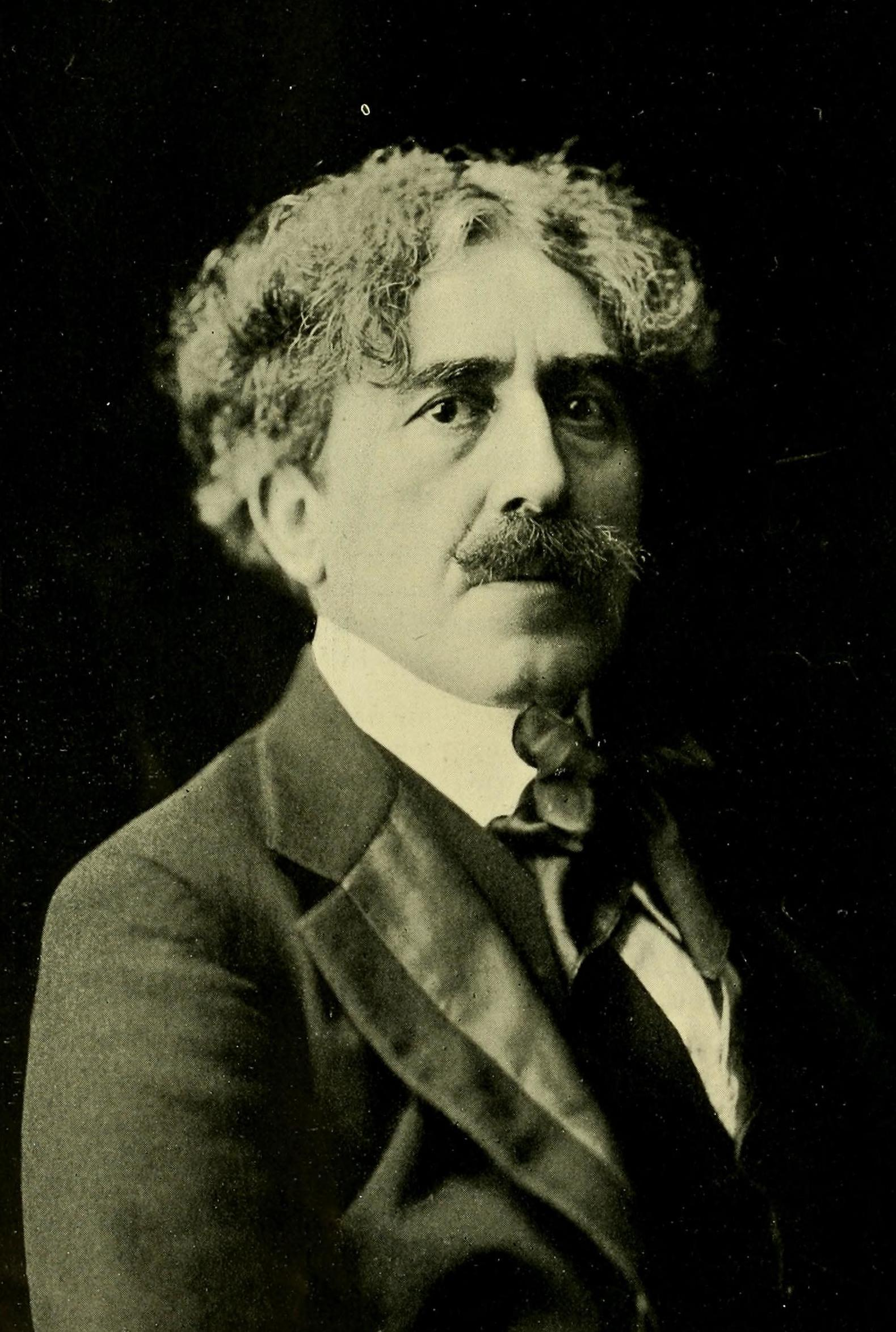
- Cadenasso c. 1900 in Camera Craft
- Born: 1854; Genoa in 1854
- Died: February 11, 1918 (aged 63–64); San Francisco, California
- Occupation: Painter

Giuseppe Leone Cadenasso (1854/8 – February 11, 1918) was an Italian-born American oil painter who lived in San Francisco, California, where he was a member of the Bohemian Club.

== Biography ==
Giuseppe Leone Cadenasso was born near Genoa in 1854 or 1858. He came to northern California at age 9. In San Francisco, he studied with a painter named Joseph Harrison and with Arthur Frank Mathews at the Mark Hopkins Institute of Art (now called the San Francisco Art Institute).

He won the gold medal at the 1917 California State Fair. According to the San Francisco Examiner, "Giuseppe Cadenasso one of the coterie of old-time artists who built up the artistic fame of San Francisco, and around his name and theirs cluster many interesting stories of the pioneer, almost vagrant days of art in San Francisco." Beginning in 1902, Cadenasso headed the art department at Mills College. He died in San Francisco on February 11, 1918.
