= Henry Geilfuss =

German-American architect

- Born: 1850; Thurin, Germany
- Died: May 10, 1922 (aged 71–72)

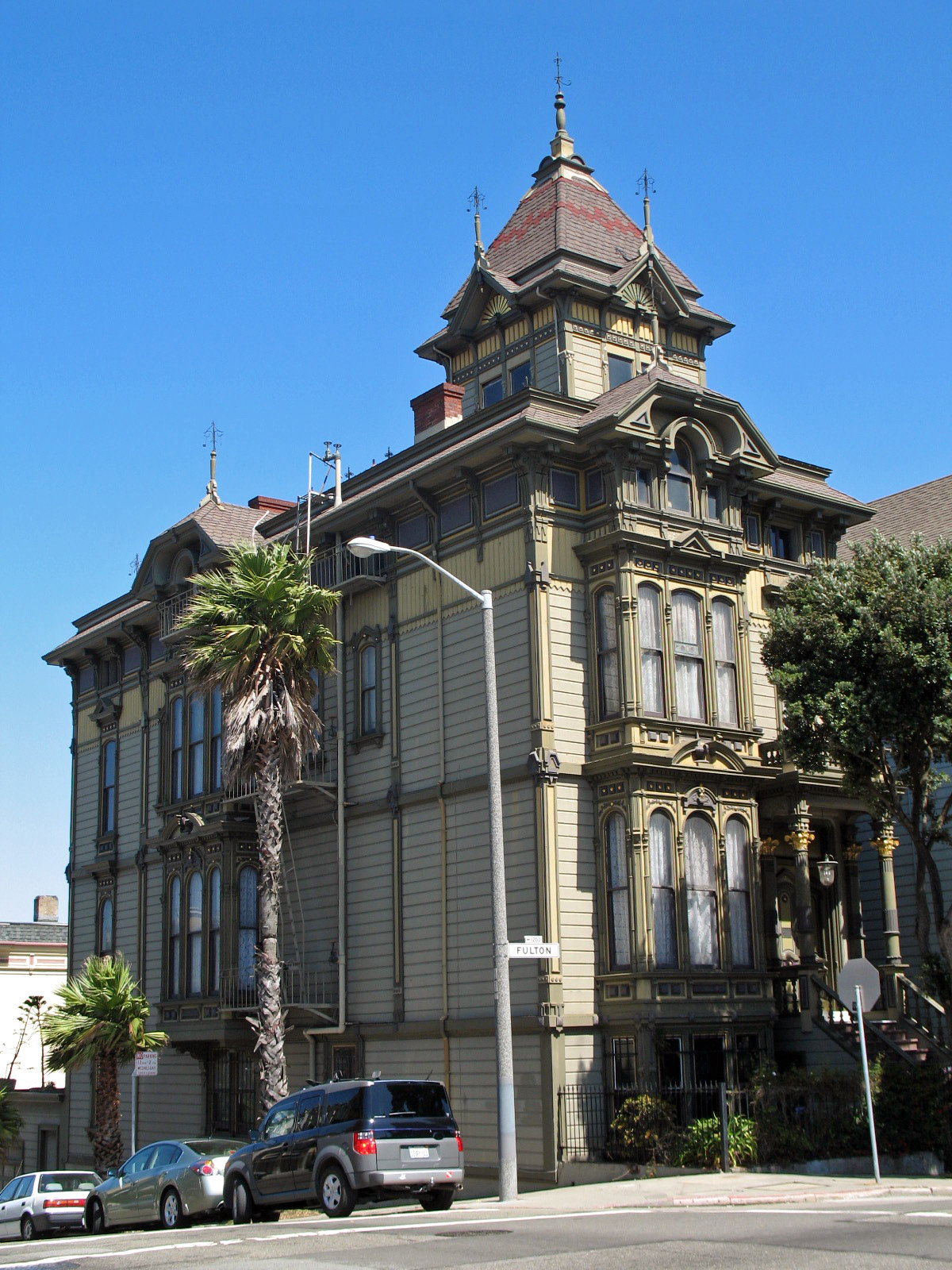
William Westerfeld House

Henry Geilfuss (July 1850 – May 10, 1922) also known as Heinrich Geilfuss, was a German-born American architect. He designed approximately 400 homes in the San Francisco Bay Area.

== Early life ==
He was born in Thuringia in 1850. He studied architecture in Erfurt, Weimar and Berlin and he first practiced architecture in Berlin designing railroad bridges.

== Career ==
Geilfuss moved to San Francisco in 1876. He designed many buildings in the Italian Villa style and in the Eastlake style of architecture. He designed approximately 400 homes in the San Francisco area. One of the more prominent homes he designed was for confectioner William Westerfeld. It is now on the National Register of Historic Places and it is referred to as the William Westerfeld House.

In 1900 Henry Geilfuss' son Carl joined the architecture firm. Henry remained in practice until at least 1910.

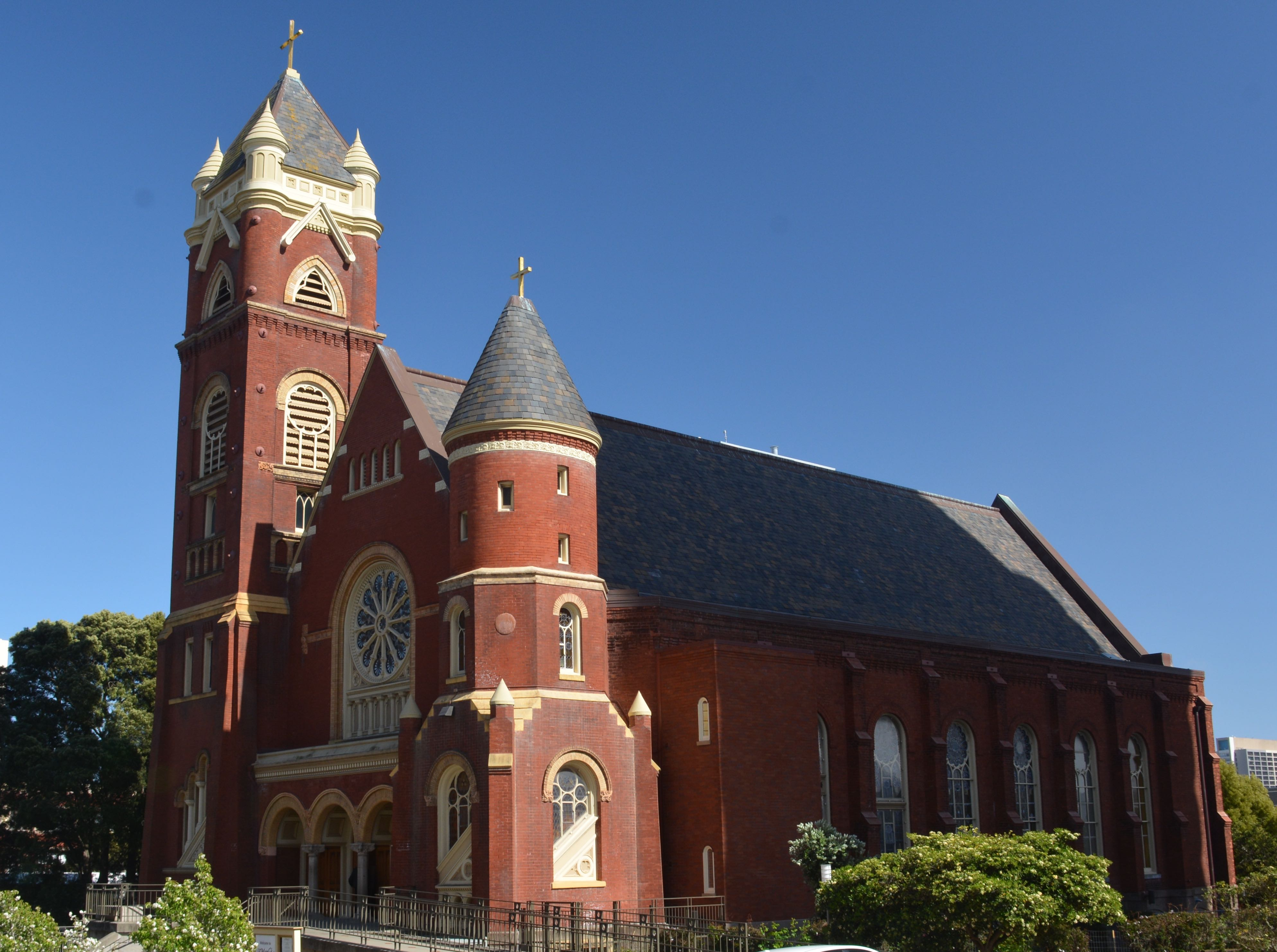
St. Mark's Evangelical Lutheran Church, San Francisco

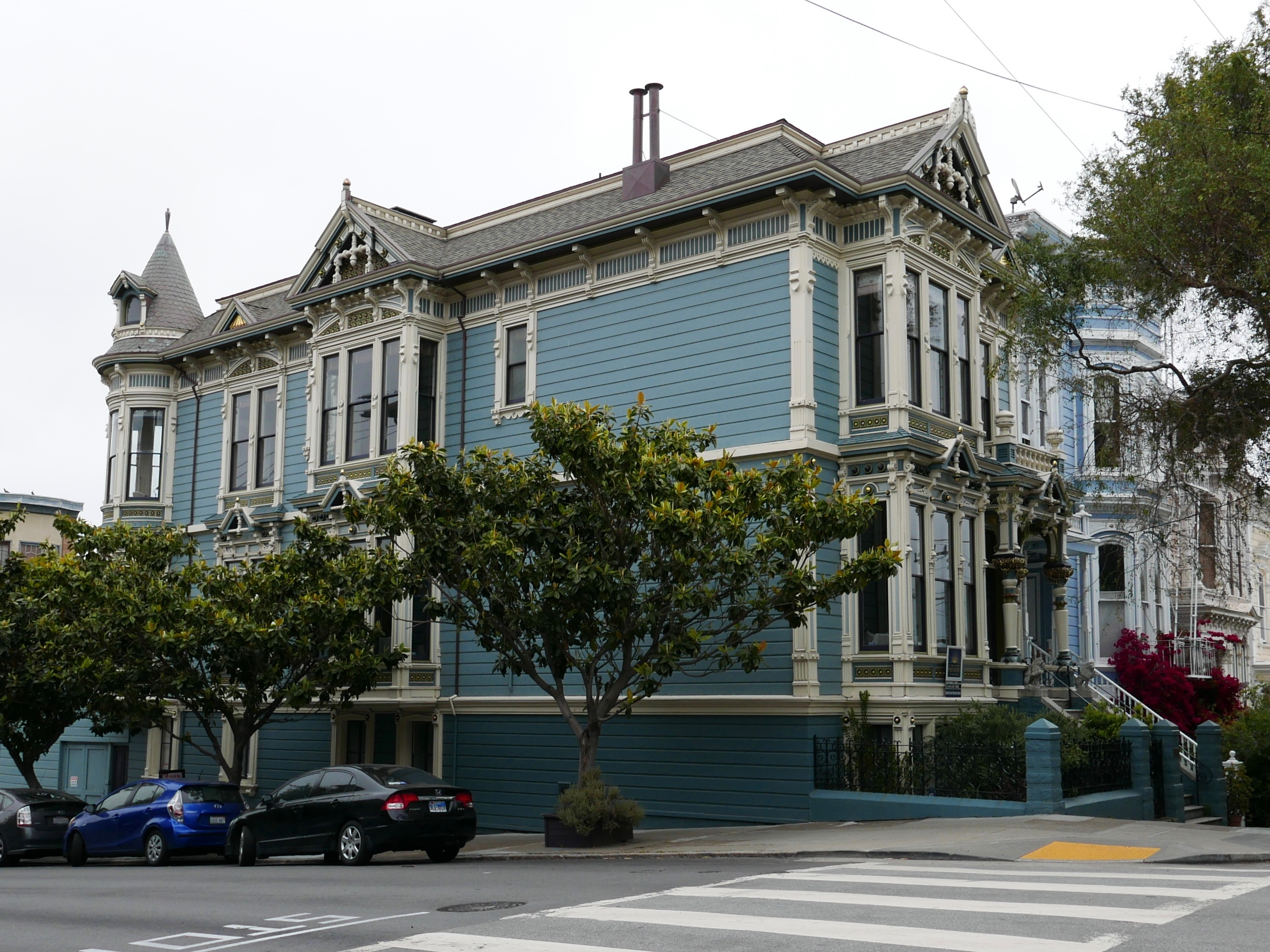
Charles Dietle House, San Francisco

== Known Works ==
- South San Francisco Opera House and Masonic Hall
- Armour&Co Meatpacking Building, 1050 Battery St, San Francisco
- Golden West Hotel, Ellis Street, San Francisco, 1891
- St. Mark's Lutheran Church, San Francisco, 1895
- Charles Dietle House, 294 Page Street, San Francisco, 1878
- William Westerfeld House, 1889
- Brune-Reutlinger House, 1886, 824 Grove Street, San Francisco
- 811 Treat Avenue, San Francisco, 1882
- 23 Henry Street, San Francisco, 1882
- 969 Page Street, San Francisco, 1893
- 1231 Page Street, San Francisco, 1889
- 605 & 611 Haight Street, San Francisco, 1888
