= William Westerfeld =

German-American confectioner (1842–1895)

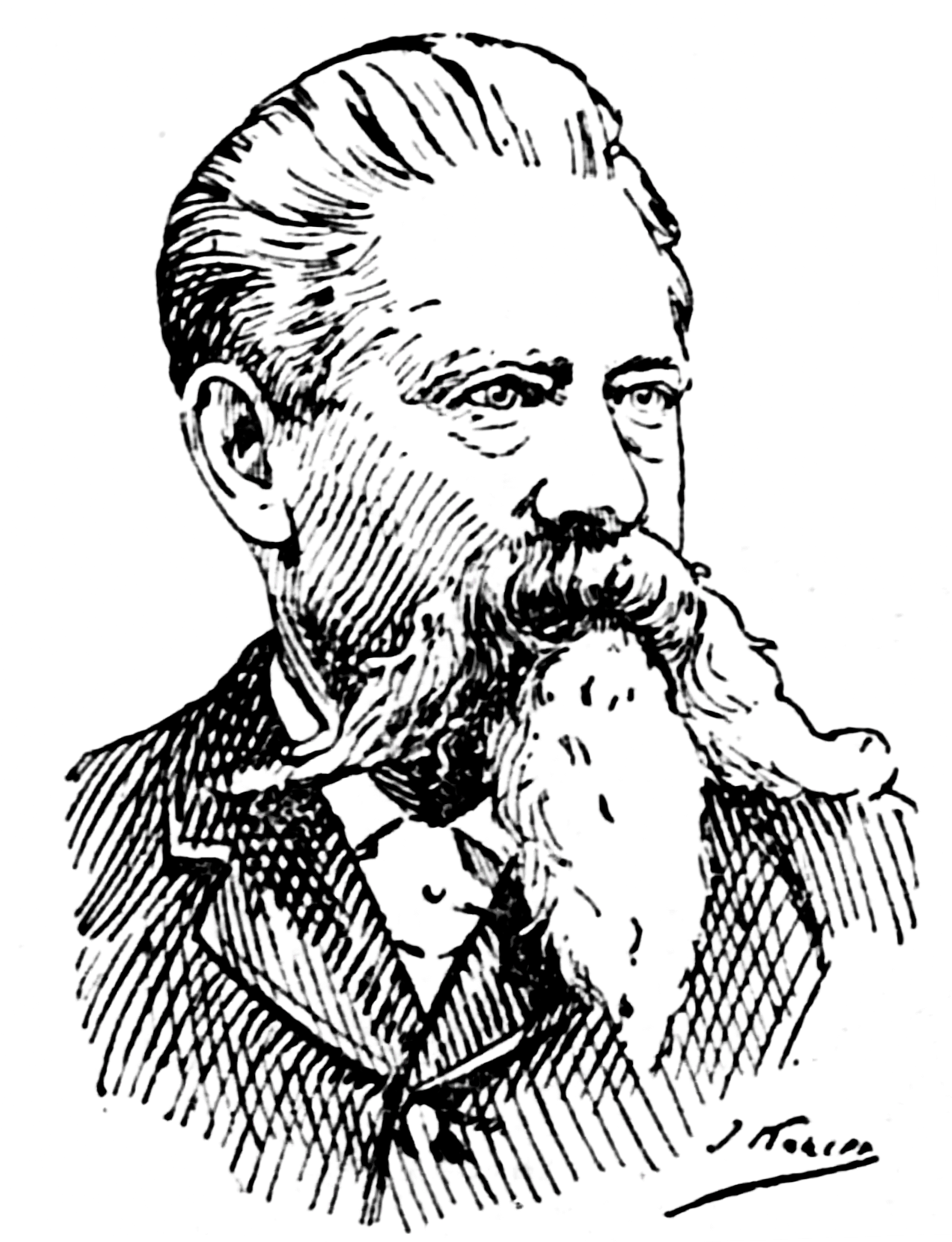
- Born: September 12, 1842; Bremen, Germany
- Died: February 18, 1895 (aged 52); San Francisco, California, US
- Resting place: Cypress Lawn Cemetery
- Occupation: Confectioner
- Years active: 1859–1895
- Known for: Westerfeld Bakery; William Westerfeld House
- Spouse: Pauline
- Children: 4

William Westerfeld (September 12, 1842 – February 18, 1895) was a German baker and confectioner who lived in San Francisco, California. He moved to America and learned the confectionery trade, and then opened his own bakery; he became prosperous. He is known for the house that he built in San Francisco, which is now referred to as the William Westerfeld House.

== Early life ==
Westerfeld was born in Syke, a suburb of Bremen, Germany, in 1842.

In 1859, he moved to California where he worked with his uncle, Louis Westerfeld, who trained him in confectionery. Westerfeld's uncle Louis was then a baker at Schroth & Westerfeld, a "coffee saloon" and bakery at 228 Kearny Street.

== Career ==
In the 1860s Westerfeld started his own confectionery business with a partner named G. T. Page. He went on to become a noted baker and confectioner operating on Market Street in San Francisco, California.

In December 1880, Westerfeld was elected president of the 64-member "Boss Bakers' Association", when it became a permanent organization.

In 1891 the Bakers' Union No. 24 organized a boycott of Westerfeld's business because he refused to allow the bakers to have Sundays off. The other bakers came to his aid publishing a response in the San Francisco Chronicle.

In 1892, another boycott of Westerfeld bakery was organized because the bakery required employees to work seven days a week instead of six.

== Personal life and death ==
Westerfeld was married to Pauline and was the father of Otto, Paul, Ella and Walla.

In 1895 he had been in poor health and had several surgeries. He died in his home which is now known as the William Westerfeld House on 1150 Fulton Street in San Francisco, California. He died on February 18, 1895. He was cremated and interred at Cypress Lawn Cemetery. The San Francisco Call stated that Westerfeld was "very prosperous" and "leaves a comfortable fortune".

== Legacy ==
By 1904, 228 Kearny Street was the location of Arfsten, Eicher, & Co. Bakers and Confectioners, a bakery and restaurant. This would insinuate that Schroth & Westfeld either moved, was renamed, or was dissolved into the new confectionery.

After Westerfeld died, Pauline and his son continued operating the business until 1906. He was remembered for his Italian Villa-style house which was designed by Henry Geilfuss and built in 1889. The home was added to the National Register of Historic Places listings in San Francisco in 1989.
