= William Westerfeld House =

Historic house in California, United States

- U.S. National Register of Historic Places
- San Francisco Designated Landmark
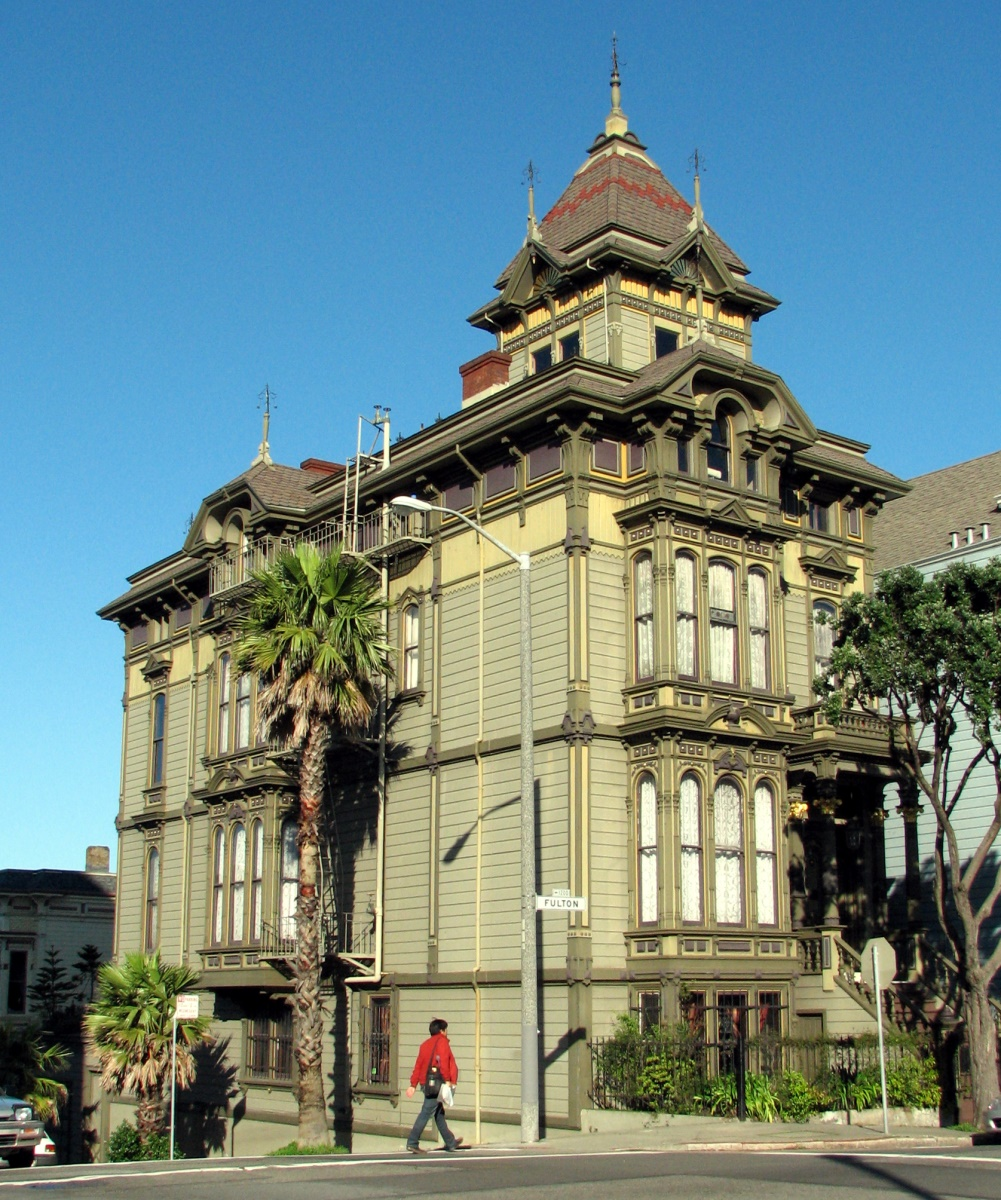

- Location within San Francisco County Location within California Location within the United States
- Location: 1198 Fulton St., San Francisco, California
- Coordinates: 37°46′38″N 122°26′11″W
- Area: 0.1 acres (0.04 ha)
- Built: 1889
- Architect: Henry Geilfuss
- Architectural style: Stick/Eastlake
- NRHP reference No.: 89000197
- SFDL No.: 135

Significant dates
- Added to NRHP: March 16, 1989
- Designated SFDL: December 6, 1981

The William Westerfeld House, also known as the "Russian Embassy", is a historic building located at 1198 Fulton Street (at Scott St.) in San Francisco, California, United States, across the street from the northwest corner of Alamo Square. Constructed for German-born confectioner William Westerfeld in 1889, the home is listed on the National Register of Historic Places and is San Francisco Landmark Number 135.

== History ==
William Westerfeld, a German-born confectioner, arrived in San Francisco in the 1870s. By the 1880s, he had established a chain of bakeries. He hired local architect Henry Geilfuss to design for his family of six a 28-room mansion with an adjoining rose garden and carriage house. The house was constructed in 1889 at a cost of $9,985 (equivalent to $357,800 in 2025).

When Westerfeld died in 1895, the home was sold to John Mahony, of Mahony Brothers, noted for building the St. Francis Hotel and the Palace Hotel after the 1906 earthquake. Mahony replaced the rose garden with flats to meet the city's dire need for housing.

In 1928, a group of Czarist Russians bought the home. They turned the ground-floor ballroom into a nightclub called Dark Eyes and used the upper floors for meeting rooms. The house became known informally as the "Russian Embassy".

In 1948, the home was converted into a 14-unit apartment building. For most of the next two decades, the units were rented to African-American musicians who played in the neighborhood jazz clubs. John Handy was allegedly one of many to call the Westerfeld House his home, although he later denied having been a boarder there.

In 1965 Charles Fracchia purchased the building to use as a residence but never occupied it. The house was mentioned in the book The Electric Kool-Aid Acid Test. The Calliope Company, a fifty-member collective, moved in. In 1967 underground filmmaker Kenneth Anger took up residence. Anger filmed Invocation of My Demon Brother starring Manson family member Bobby Beausoleil, Church of Satan founder Anton LaVey, and featuring music by Mick Jagger.

In 1968, members of Family Dog Productions occupied the house while promoting acid rock concerts at the Avalon Ballroom. Members of the Grateful Dead and Big Brother and the Holding Company were frequent visitors.

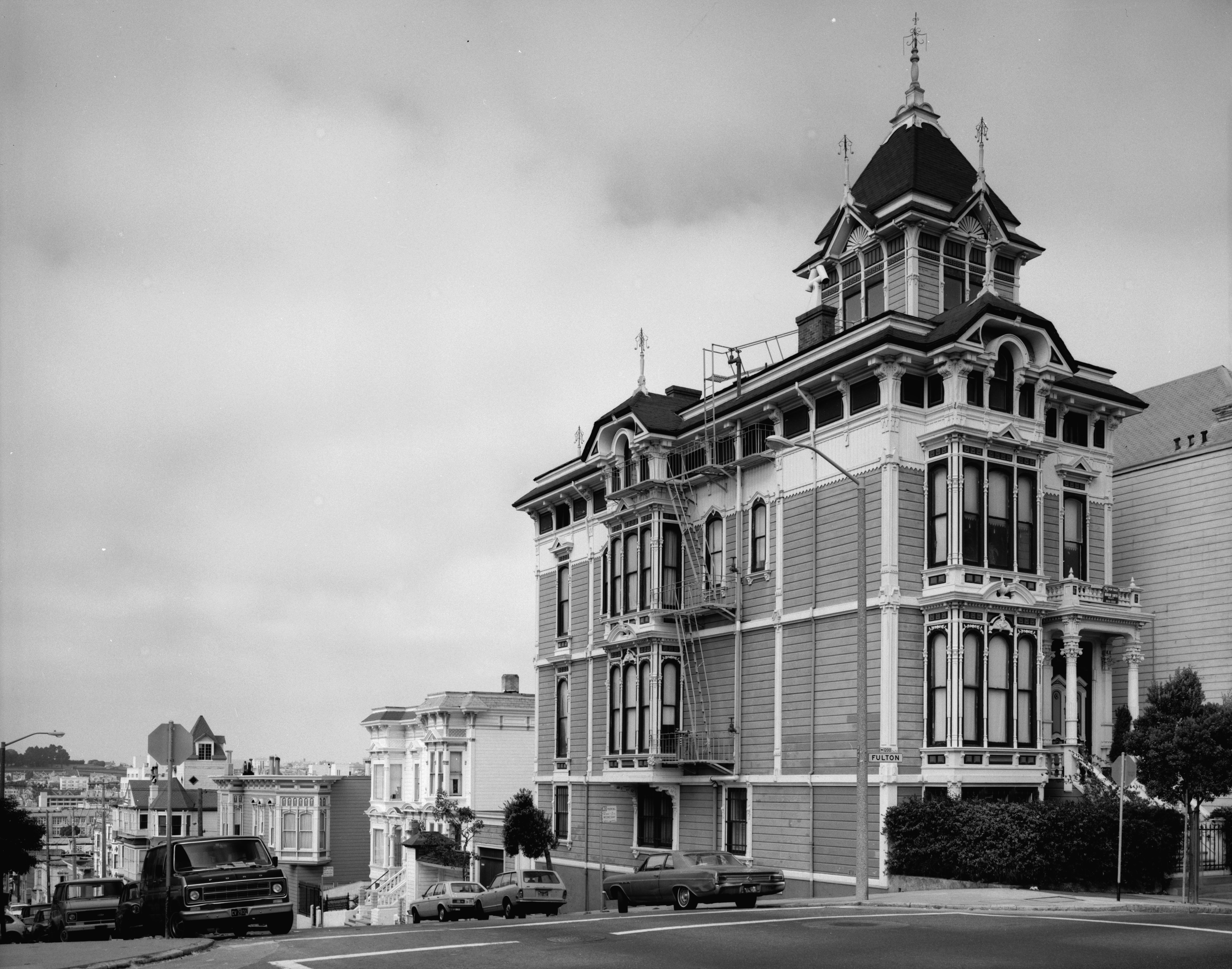
The house, as seen in 1981.

The first attempts to rehabilitate the building began in the 1970s. Two men purchased the home for $45,000 in 1969 (equivalent to $395,000 in 2025). They remodeled the fourth floor servants' quarters beyond recognition. The house was left standing despite an urban renewal project, which claimed 6,000 Victorian-era buildings over a 60-block area in the Western Addition.

Jim Siegel purchased the home in 1986 for $750,000 and has since retrofitted the foundation, removed the dropped ceilings, re-wired, re-roofed, and re-plumbed, and restored the interior and exterior woodwork and the historic, ground-floor ballroom, and decorated the 25-foot (7.6 m) ceiling with period wallpaper crafted by Bradbury & Bradbury.

== See also ==
- List of San Francisco Designated Landmarks
