= Painted ladies =

In American architecture, repainted Victorian and Edwardian houses

Coordinates: 37°46′35″N 122°25′59″W

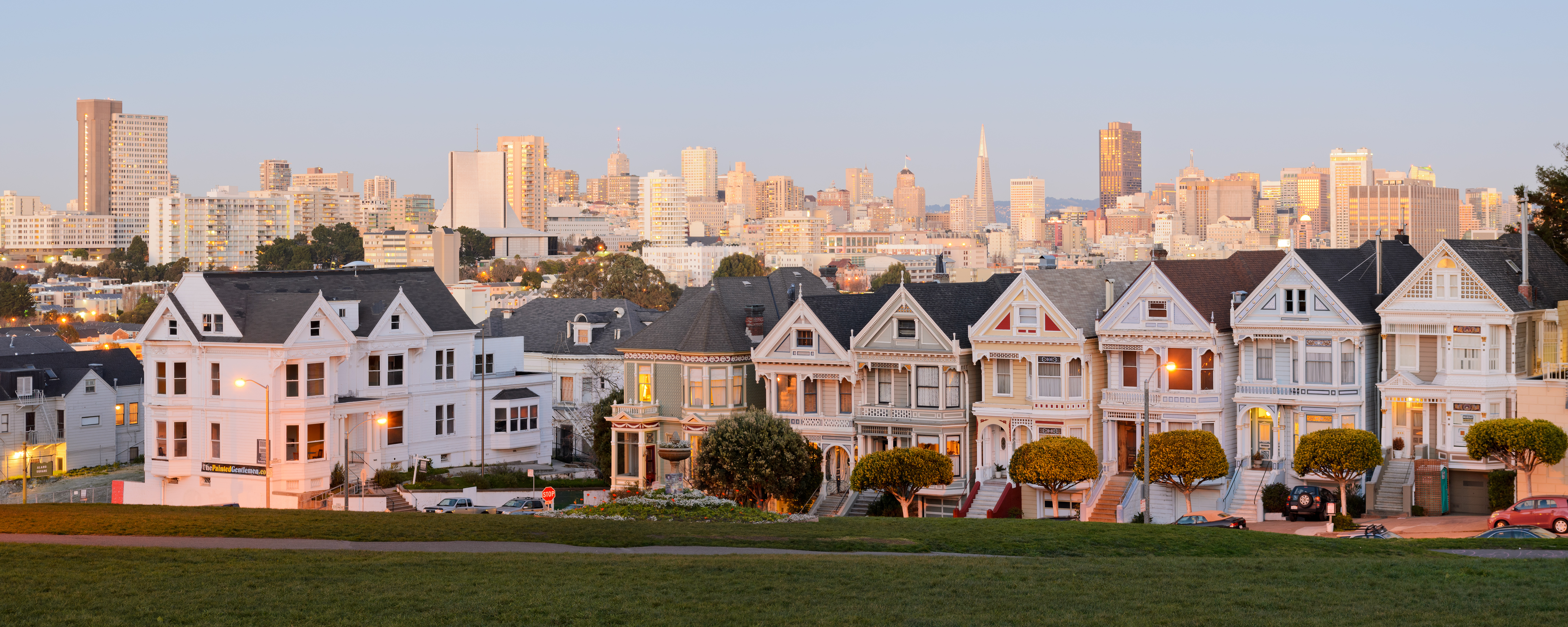
Painted ladies near Alamo Square, San Francisco, California

In American architecture, painted ladies are Victorian and Edwardian houses repainted, starting in the 1960s, in three or more colors that embellish or accentuate their architectural details. The term was first used for San Francisco Victorian houses by Morley Baer, Elizabeth Pomada, and Michael Larsen in their 1978 book, Painted Ladies: San Francisco's Resplendent Victorians. Although polychrome decoration was common in the Victorian era, the colors used on these houses in the modern era are not based on historical precedent.

Since then, the term has also been used to describe groups of colorfully repainted Victorian houses in other American cities, such as the Charles Village neighborhood in Baltimore; Lafayette Square in St. Louis; the greater San Francisco and New Orleans areas, in general; Columbia-Tusculum in Cincinnati; the Old West End in Toledo, Ohio; the neighborhoods of McKnight and Forest Park in Springfield, Massachusetts; and the city of Cape May, New Jersey. They also exist internationally, for example in Wellington, New Zealand.

== San Francisco's painted ladies ==
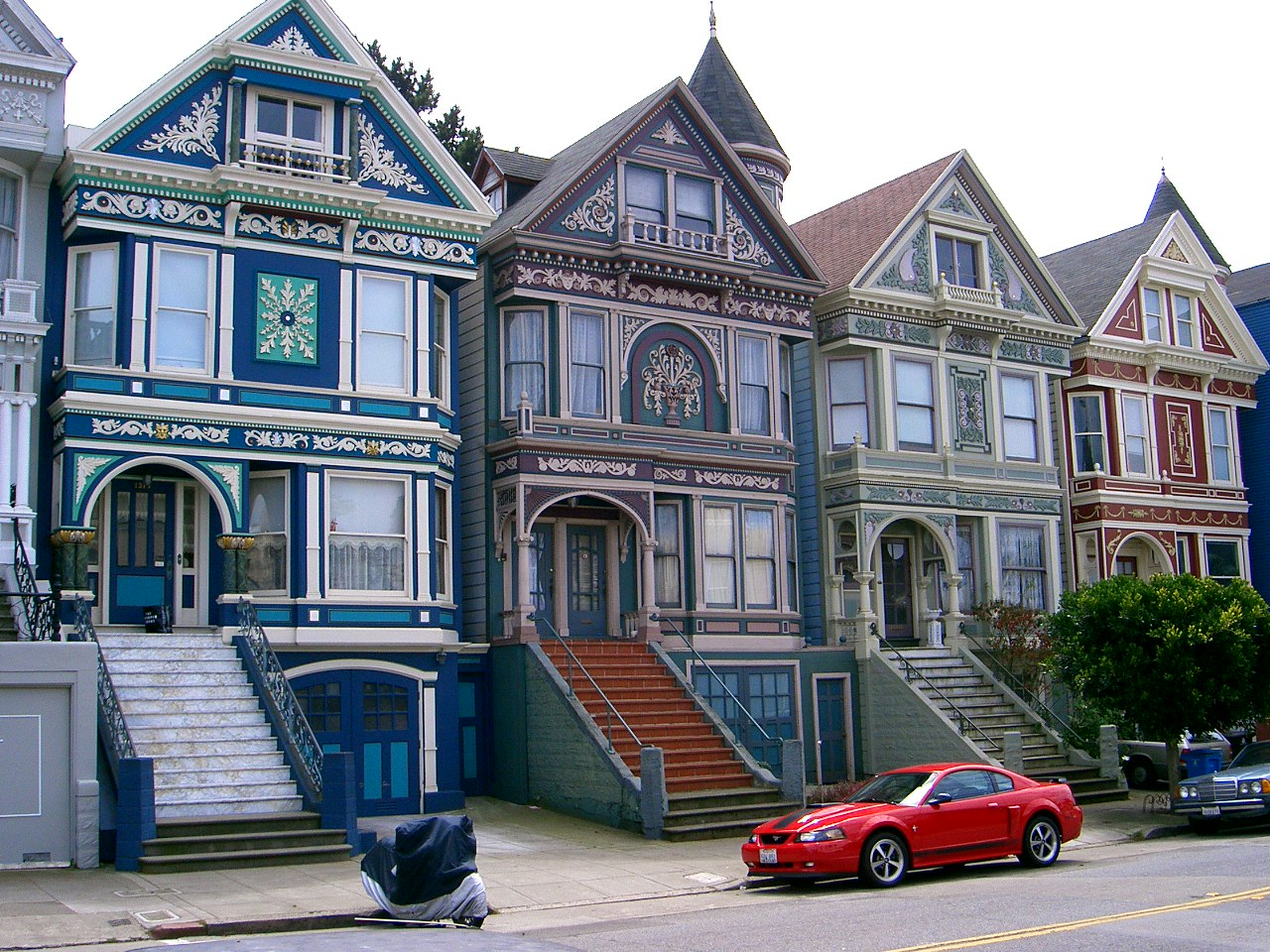
Victorian houses in the Haight-Ashbury neighborhood of San Francisco, California.

Approximately 48,000 houses in the Victorian and Edwardian styles were built in San Francisco between 1849 and 1915 (with the change from Victorian to Edwardian occurring on the death of Queen Victoria in 1901). Many were painted in bright colors. As one newspaper critic noted in 1885, "… red, yellow, chocolate, orange, everything that is loud is in fashion … if the upper stories are not of red or blue … they are painted up into uncouth panels of yellow and brown …" While many of the mansions of Nob Hill (which were largely of masonry construction) were destroyed by the 1906 San Francisco earthquake, thousands of the mass-produced, modest wooden houses, which are more flexible, survived in the western and southern neighborhoods of the city.

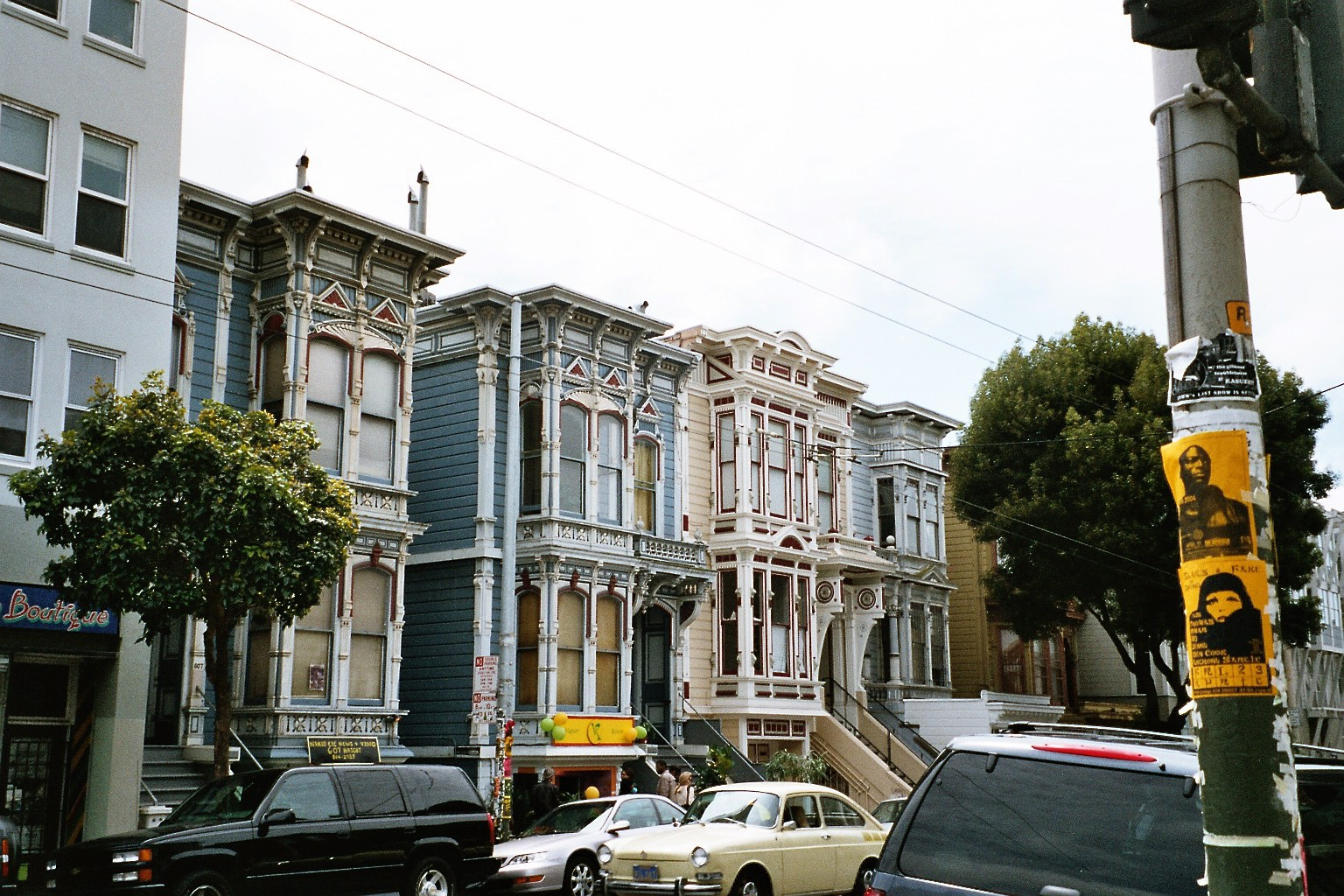
Painted ladies in the Lower Haight, San Francisco, California

During World War I and World War II many of these houses were painted battleship gray with war-surplus Navy paint. Another 16,000 were demolished. Many others had the Victorian décor stripped off or covered with tarpaper, brick, stucco, or aluminum siding.

In 1963, San Francisco artist Butch Kardum began combining intense blues and greens on the exterior of his Italianate-style Victorian house. His house was criticized by some, but other neighbors began to copy his example. Kardum became a color designer, and he and other artist/colorists such as Tony Canaletich, Bob Buckter, and Jazon Wonders began to transform dozens of gray houses into painted ladies. By the 1970s, the colorist movement, as it was called, had changed entire streets and neighborhoods. The process continues to this day.

One of the best-known groups of painted ladies is the row of Victorian houses at 710–720 Steiner Street across from Alamo Square park. It is sometimes known as "Postcard Row"; they are also known as the Seven Sisters. The houses were built between 1892 and 1896 by developer Matthew Kavanaugh, who lived next door in the 1892 mansion at 722 Steiner Street. This block appears very frequently in media and mass-market photographs of the city and its tourist attractions and has appeared in an estimated 70 movies, TV programs, and ads, including in the opening credits of the television series Full House and its sequel Fuller House. The house at 714 Steiner sold for $3.5 million in 2020 and was for sale again in 2022.

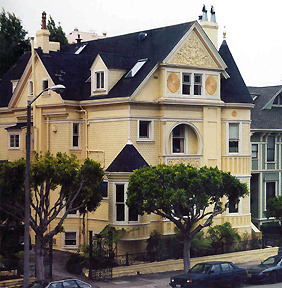
The C. A. Belden House, a Queen Anne in the Pacific Heights section of San Francisco on Gough Street between Clay and Washington streets. The house is on the National Register of Historic Places.

== See also ==
- Terraced house
