= Victorian house =

Houses built during the reign of Queen Victoria (1837–1901)

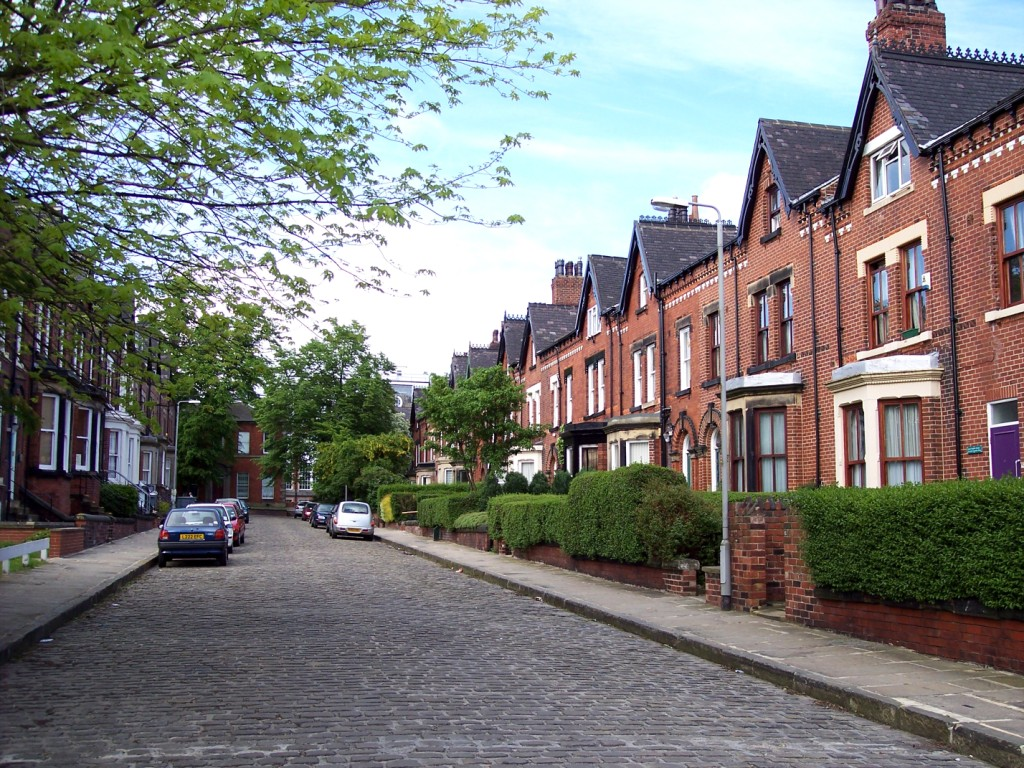
Typical Victorian terraced houses in England, built in brick with slate roofs, stone details and modest decoration

In Great Britain and former British colonies, a Victorian house generally is any house built during the reign of Queen Victoria. During the Industrial Revolution, successive housing booms resulted in the building of many millions of Victorian houses, which are now a defining feature of most British towns and cities.

In the United Kingdom, Victorian houses follow a wide range of architectural styles. Starting from the early classicism inherited from Regency architecture, the Italianate style gained influence in the 1840s and 1850s, and the Gothic Revival style became prevalent by the 1880s. Later in the Victorian era, the Queen Anne style and the Arts and Crafts movement increased in influence, resulting in the transition to styles typically seen in Edwardian houses. Victorian houses are also found in many former British colonies where the style might be adapted to local building materials or customs, for example in Sydney, Australia and Melaka, Malaysia.

The Victorian Society is a membership charity which campaigns for Victorian architecture.

In the United States, Victorian house styles include Second Empire, Queen Anne, Stick (and Eastlake Stick), Shingle, Richardsonian Romanesque, and others.

== Great Britain ==
Early in the Victorian era (up to the 1840s) houses were still influenced by the classicism of Regency styles. However the simplicity of Regency classicism fell out of favour as affluence increased and by the 1850s the Italianate style influenced domestic architecture which now incorporated varying quantities of stucco. From the 1850s domestic buildings also became increasingly influenced by the Gothic Revival, incorporating features such as pointed, projecting porches, bay windows, and grey slate.

=== Typical features ===
In addition to general architectural influences, this progressive change in style resulted from several other factors. In the 1850s, the abolition of tax on glass and bricks made these items cheaper yet a suitable material and the coming of the railway allowed them to be manufactured elsewhere, at low cost and to standard sizes and methods, and brought to site. There was also progressive introduction from the 1850s of various building regulations. There are a number of common themes in Victorian housing:

- Sanitation: Regulations were introduced progressively from the 1850s to raise the importance of sanitation features, including correct drainage, waste facilities (the ash pit, or dust bin), and toilet facilities either in the form of an outside privy or inside water closet.
- Hot and cold water: At the start of the Victorian era, some houses had running tap water and a boiler for hot water. By the turn of the century, hot and cold running water were a common feature.
- Lighting powered by gas was available in many towns from the start of the Victorian era. By the end of the Victorian era, many houses had gas.
- A basement with a cellar for the storage of coal, required for open fires and to heat water.
- Sash windows but with larger panes of glass, from the 1850s, than the characteristic six plus six smaller panes seen in Georgian and Regency architecture.
- The brick chimney was a prominent feature in Victorian homes, consisting of a fireplace, chimney breast and chimney stack that protruded above the roof line to exhaust smoke.
- Victorian houses were generally built in terraces or as detached houses.
- Building materials were brick or local stone. Bricks were made in factories some distance away, to standard sizes, rather than the earlier practice of digging clay locally and making bricks on site.
- The majority of houses were roofed with slate, quarried mainly in Wales and carried by rail. The clay tiles used in some houses would be available locally.
- Vegetation and small gardens were often incorporated into Victorian homes, as forms of nature were prized by the suburban domestic ideal.

=== Houses for all classes ===
In Victorian times, population growth, and the Industrial Revolution which saw a migration of workers from the countryside to the cities, resulted in successive housing booms in the 1850s and 1870s that saw the creation of millions of houses. These catered not only for the rich and the new "middling-classes" but also for the poor.

In deprived areas, Victorian houses were often very small, for example, back-to-back houses built in extremely cramped conditions. Some of these areas became slums or 'rookeries', and were later cleared. Some smaller, two-up two-down houses still survive, for example in Salford, Greater Manchester.

Victorian houses for the middle classes and upwards tended to have accommodation for servants, often employed to carry out the considerable labour required to keep the house, including its fireplaces, clean and well stocked.

Victorian houses of the middle and upper classes aspired to follow the purest forms of contemporary architecture, for example, the Gothic Revival or Queen Anne styles.

=== Great houses ===
The Victorian and Edwardian eras together were the last sustained period in which great houses were built in large numbers. Many of these harked back to earlier periods of English architecture, for example:

- Waddesdon Manor in Renaissance Revival style
- Highclere Castle in Tudorbethan style ^{(link says it's actually Jacobethan)}
- Harlaxton Manor in Jacobethan style
- Canford manor following the medieval style and incorporating a great hall
- Penrhyn Castle in Norman style
- Mentmore Towers in Jacobethan style
- Tyntesfield in Gothic Revival style

== North America ==
Victorian-era homes in eastern American cities tend to be three or four-story, while those in western American cities tend to be two or two-and-a-half-story houses or one to one-and-a-half-story cottages. This is not representative of a typical Victorian-era home in all regions.

Although the general public often incorrectly refers to a Victorian-era house as a Victorian-style house, Victorian era refers to a time period and not to a style. Although architectural historians generally agree that about eight primary architectural styles were prominent in the United States and Canada during the Victorian era, Victorian-era residential architecture in the United States and Canada was a procession of styles borrowed from countries and historical styles.

One feature that became popular in the Victorian era was the use of wooden gingerbread trims to create ornate embellishments to decorate their homes. This was a reinterpretation of European Gothic Revival architecture using timber that was abundantly available in North America. With the invention of steam-powered scroll saw, the gingerbread trims could be produced en masse. The popularity started in the east in 1870 and spread to the west five to ten years later.

=== Examples ===
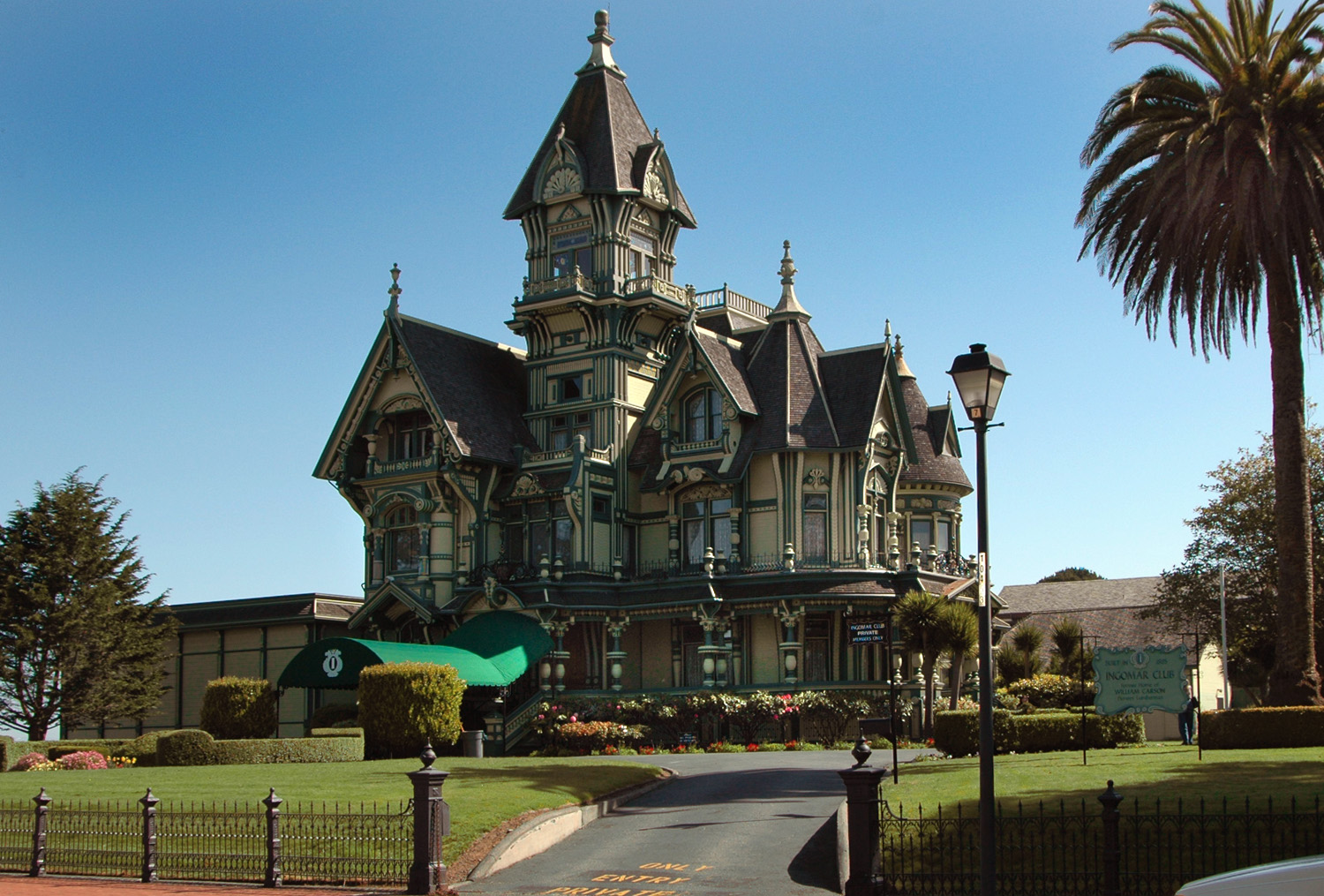
High execution of U.S. Queen Anne style: The Carson Mansion, located in Eureka, California

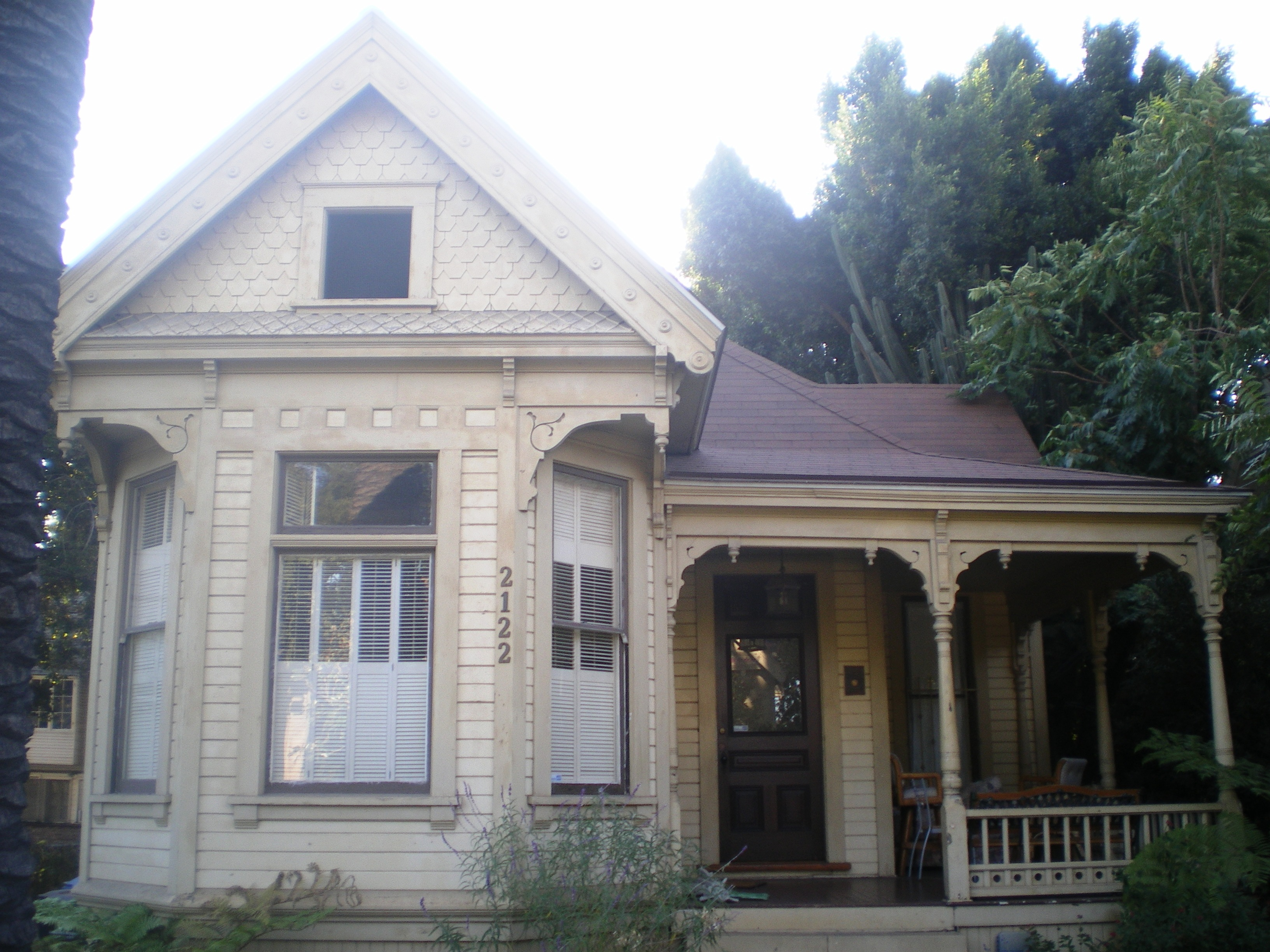
John B. Kane Residence, South Los Angeles (Eastlake)

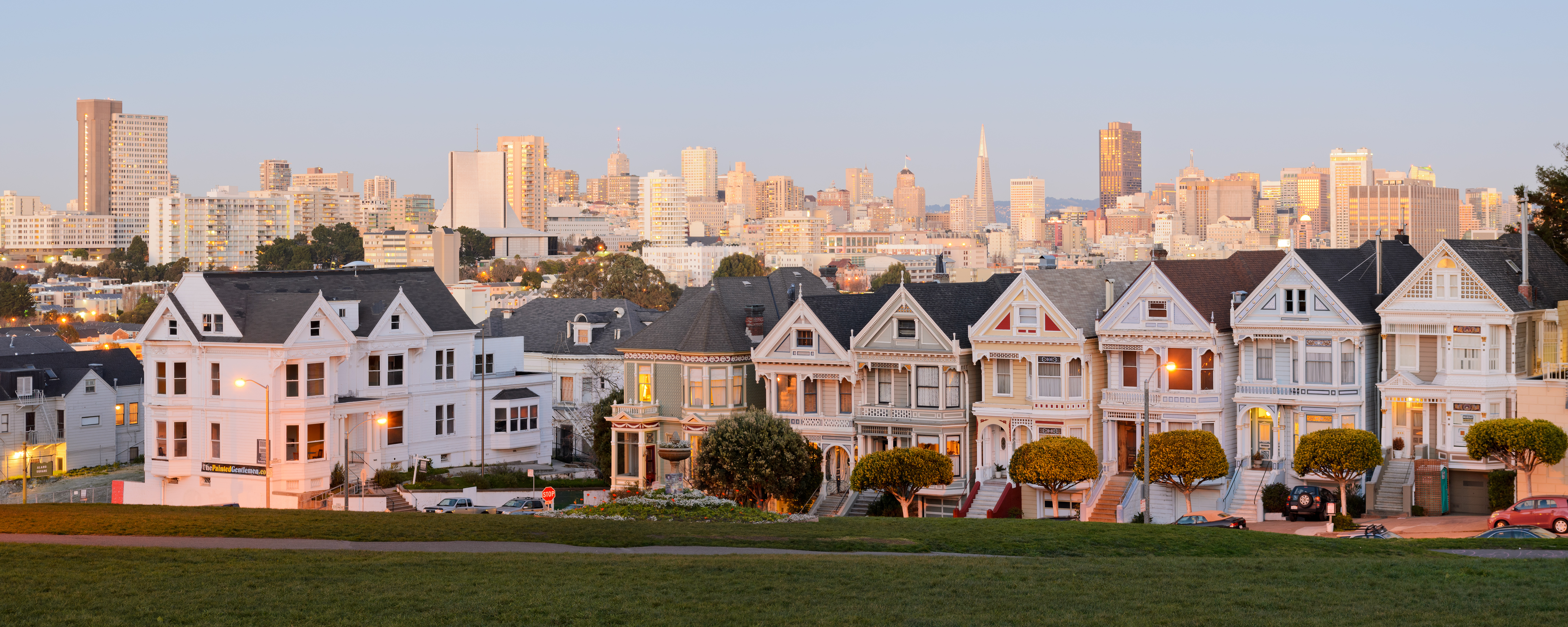
Alamo Square, San Francisco (Painted ladies)

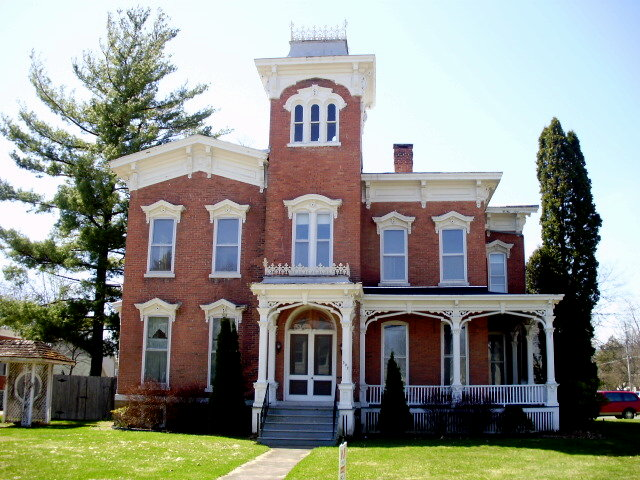
The Farnam Mansion, Oneida, New York (Italianate)

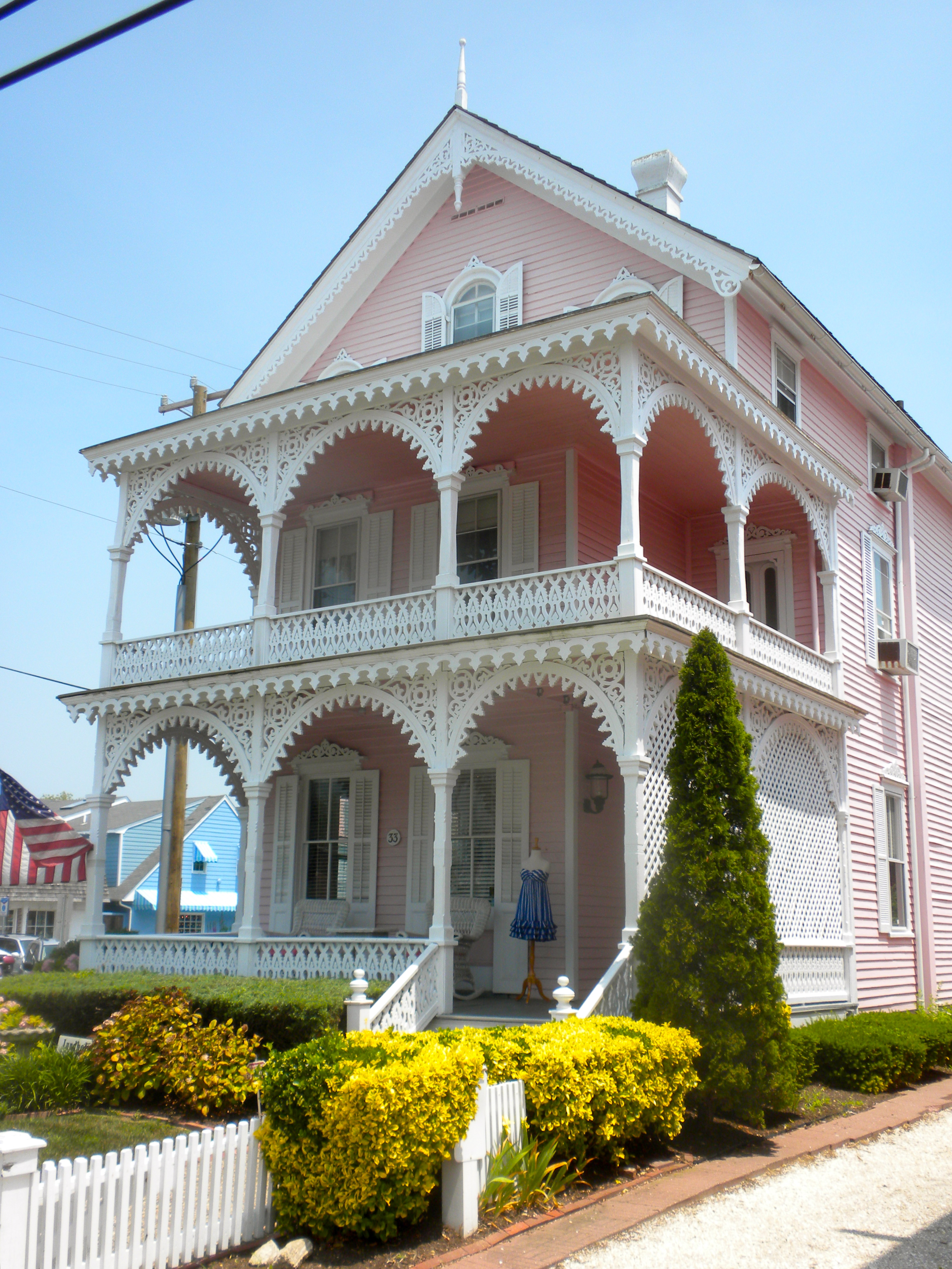
A house in the Cape May Historic District with elaborate gingerbread trims

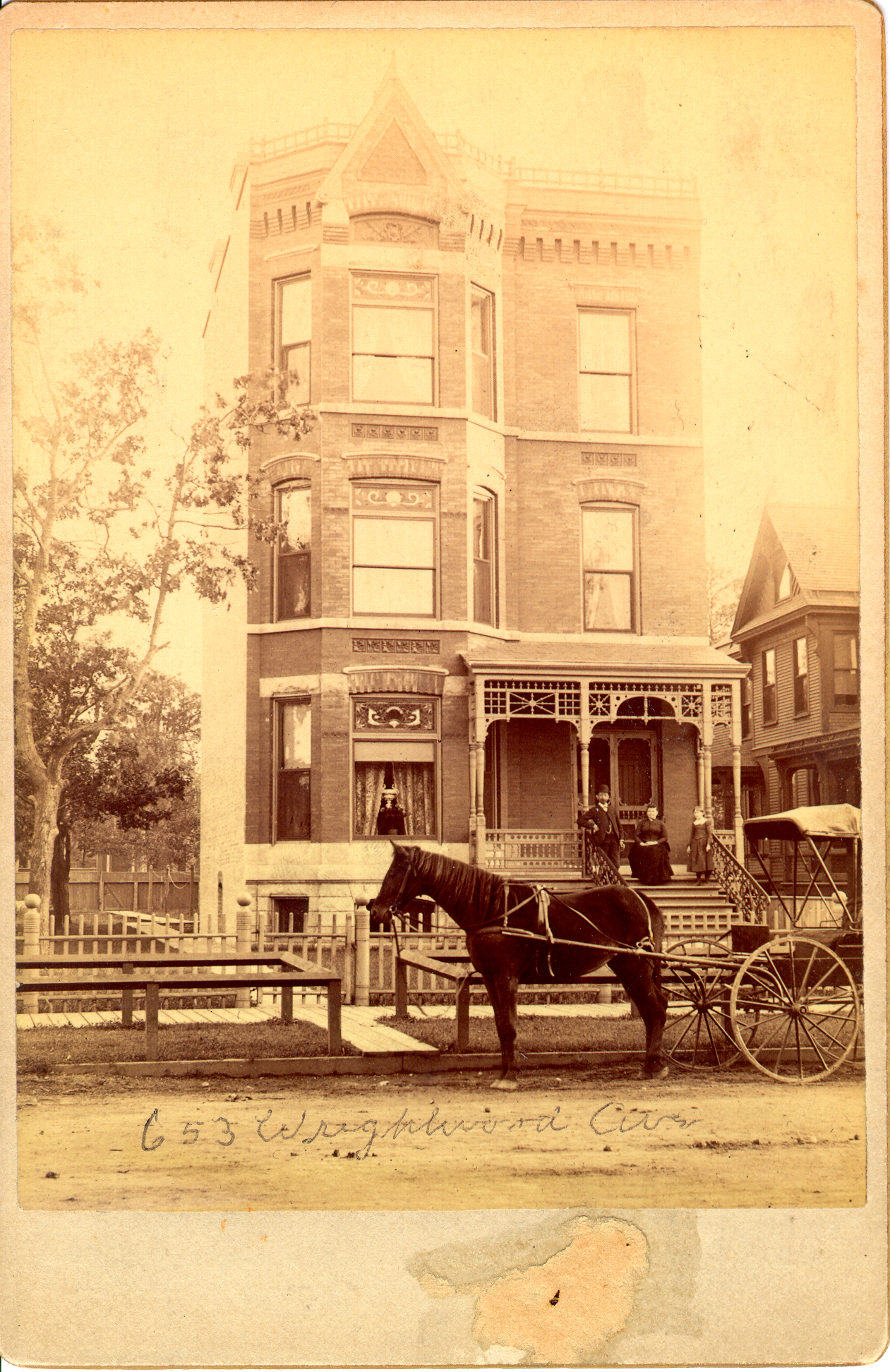
This is an 1880s photo of 653 West Wrightwood (now 655 West Wrightwood) in Lincoln Park, Chicago, Illinois. Note the wooden sidewalk, dirt road and lack of buildings surrounding the edifice.

== Australia ==
In Australia, eight styles predominated for homes in the Victorian period:

- Victorian Georgian
- Victorian Regency
- Filigree
- Italianate
- Tudor
- Free Gothic
- Rustic Gothic
- Free Classical

(The Arts and Crafts style and Queen Anne style are placed in the Federation period, from 1890 to 1915.)

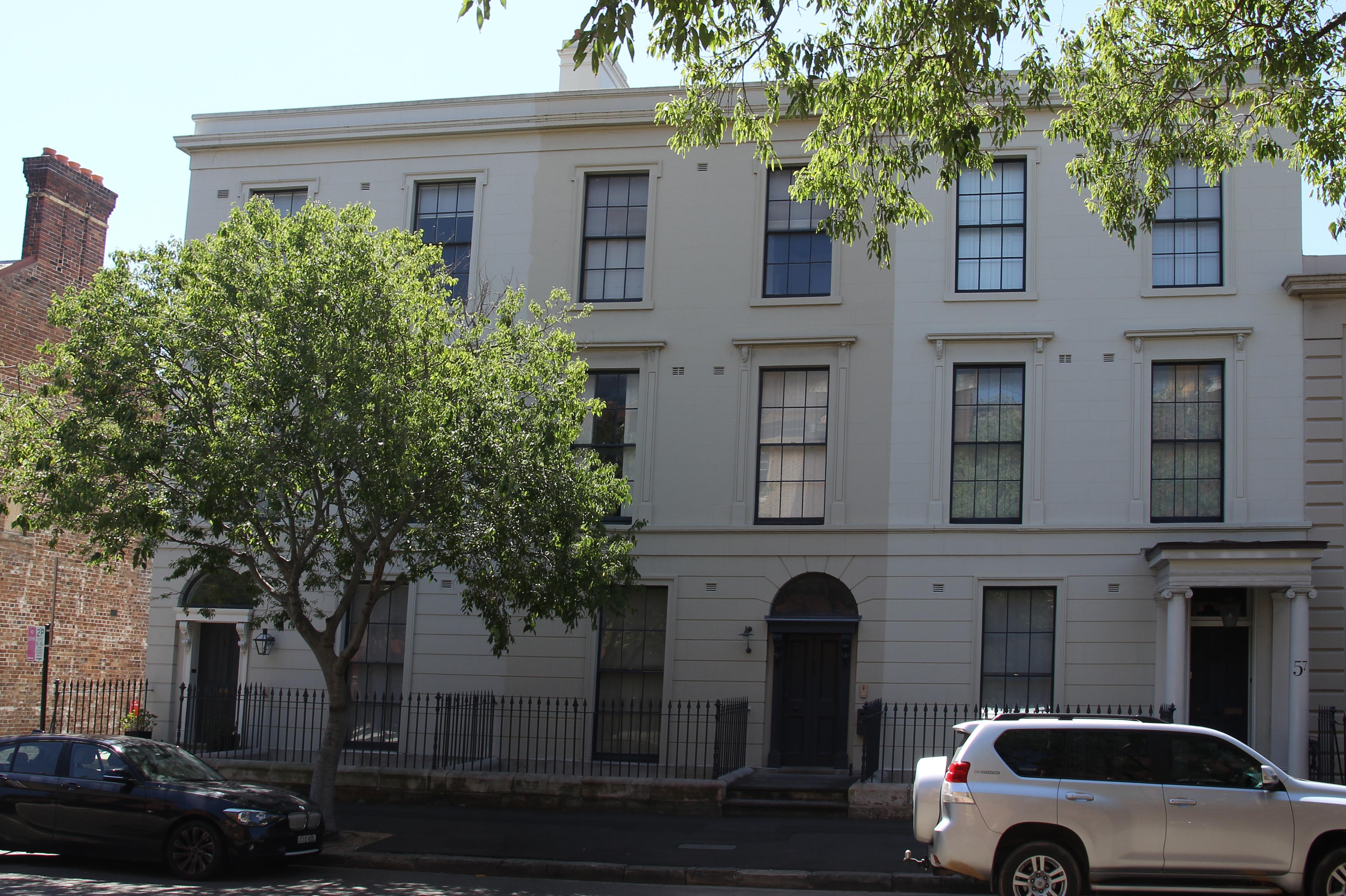
Regency terraces in Millers Point, Sydney

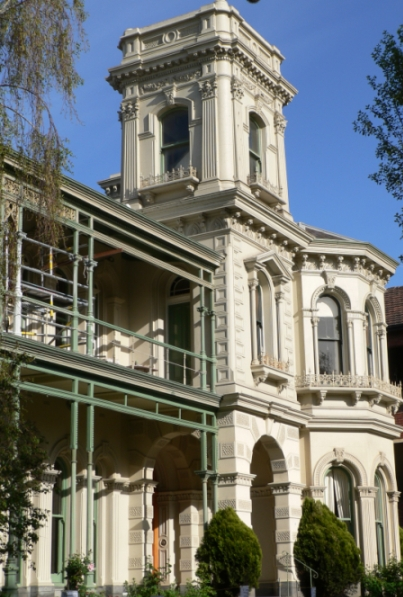
Italianate home in St Kilda, Melbourne

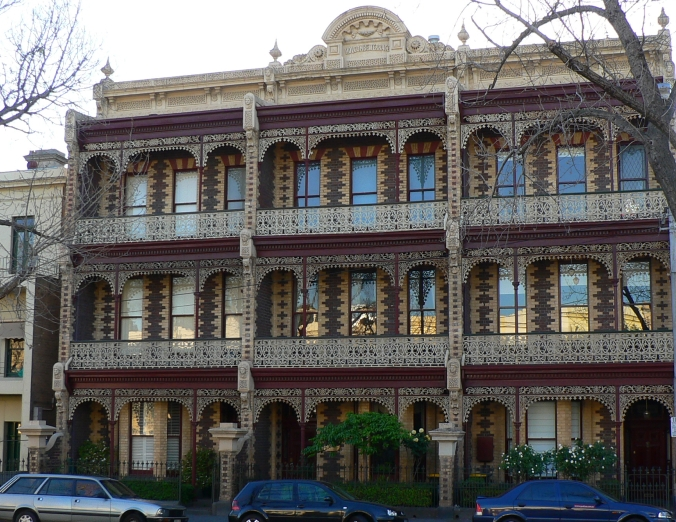
Victorian Filigree-style terraces in Carlton, Melbourne

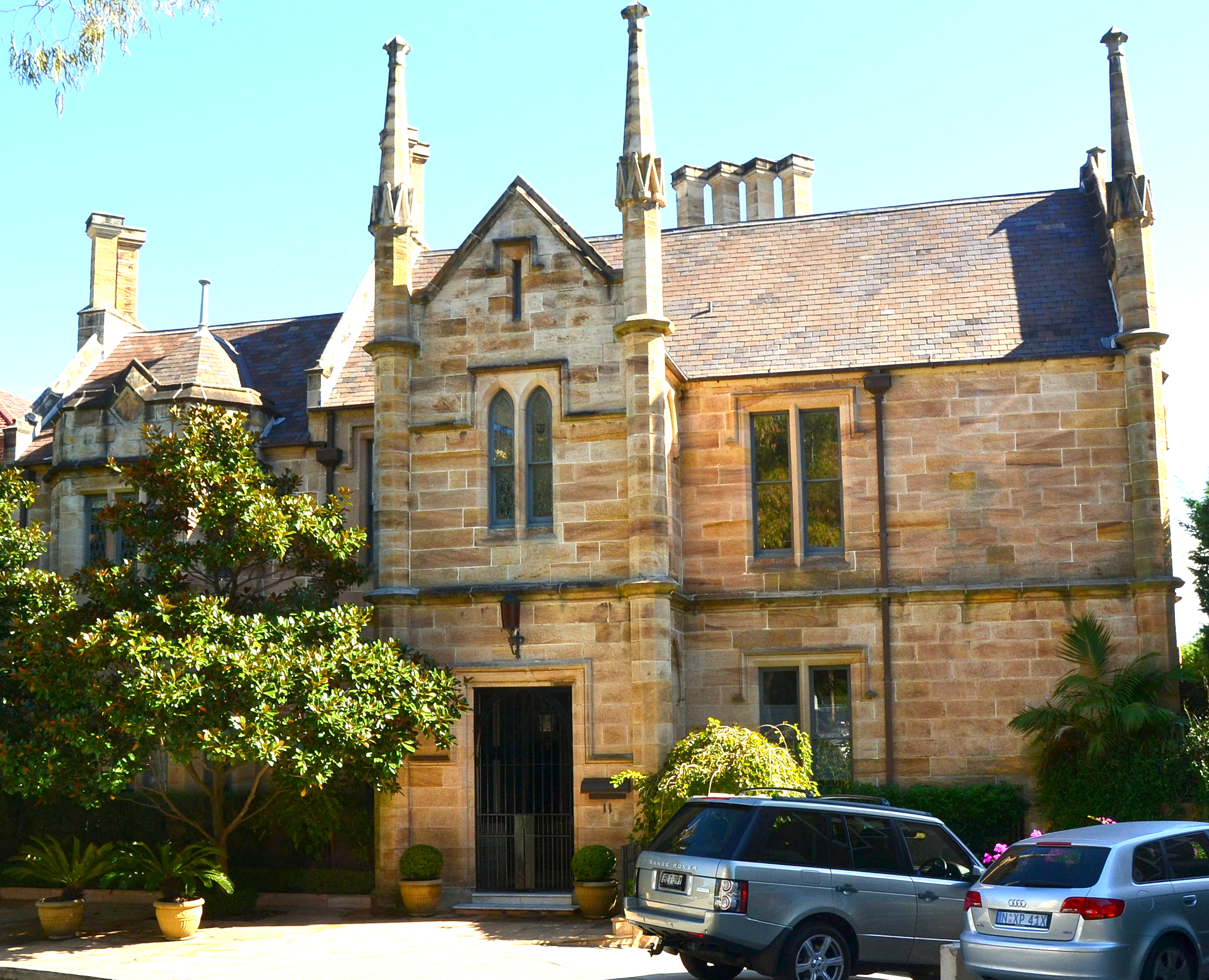
Free Gothic residence in Double Bay, Sydney

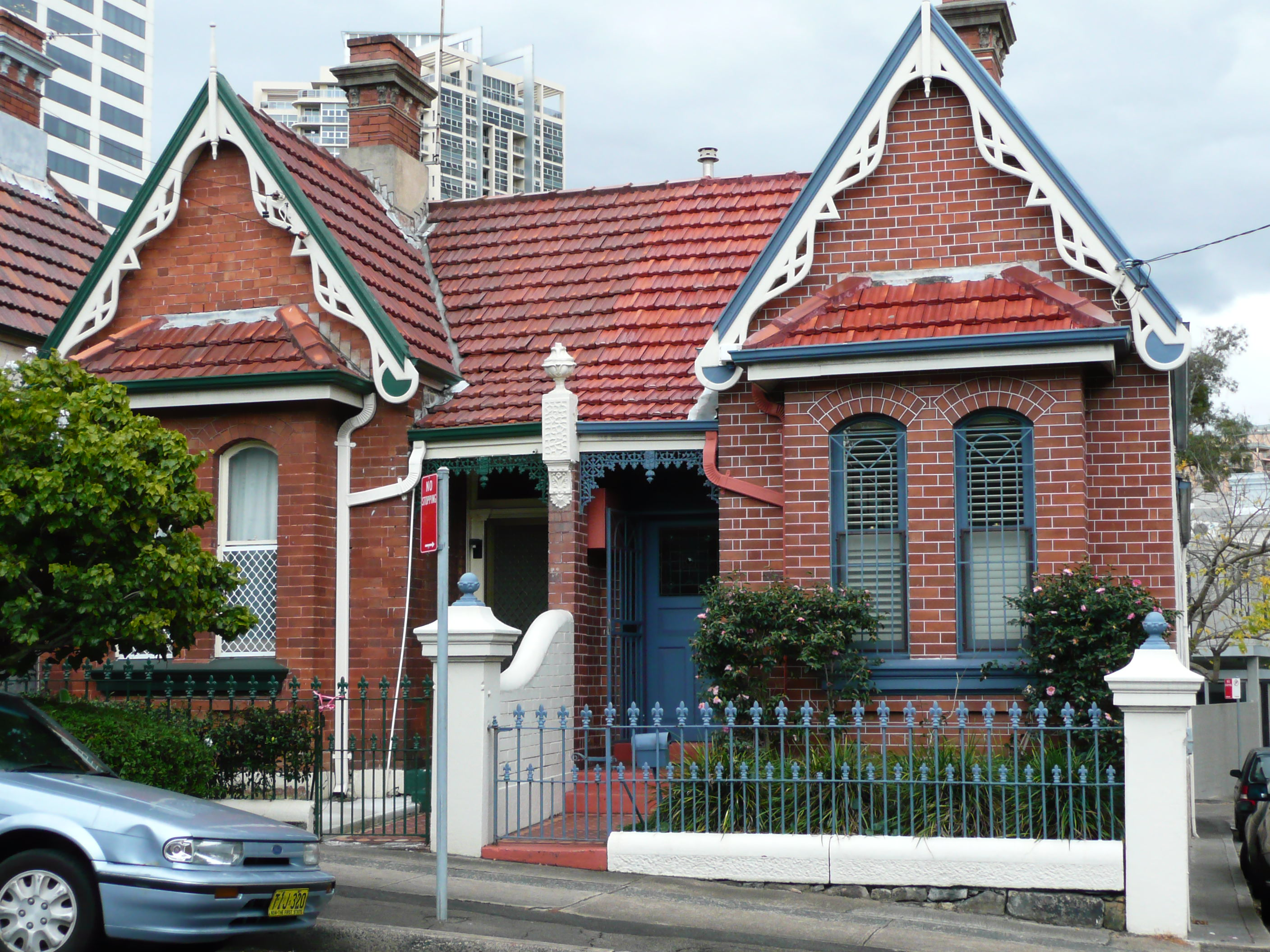
Semi-detached Rustic Gothic homes in Sydney

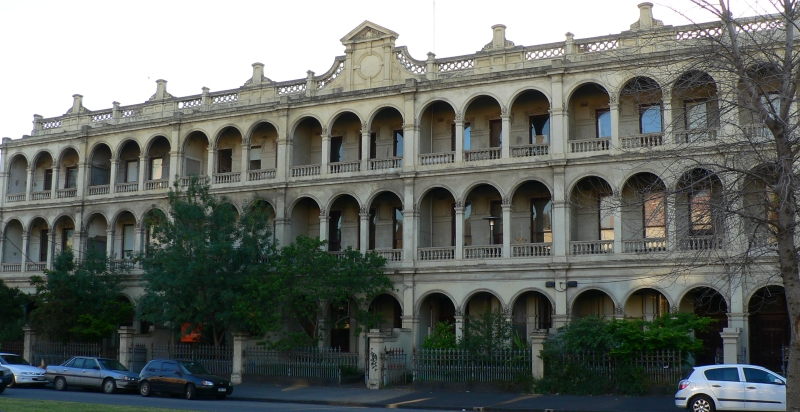
Drummond Terrace, Melbourne in Free Classical style

== See also ==
- Victorian architecture
- List of house styles
- Second Empire architecture
- Wesleyan Grove
