= Alamo Square, San Francisco =

Alamo Square
- Neighborhood
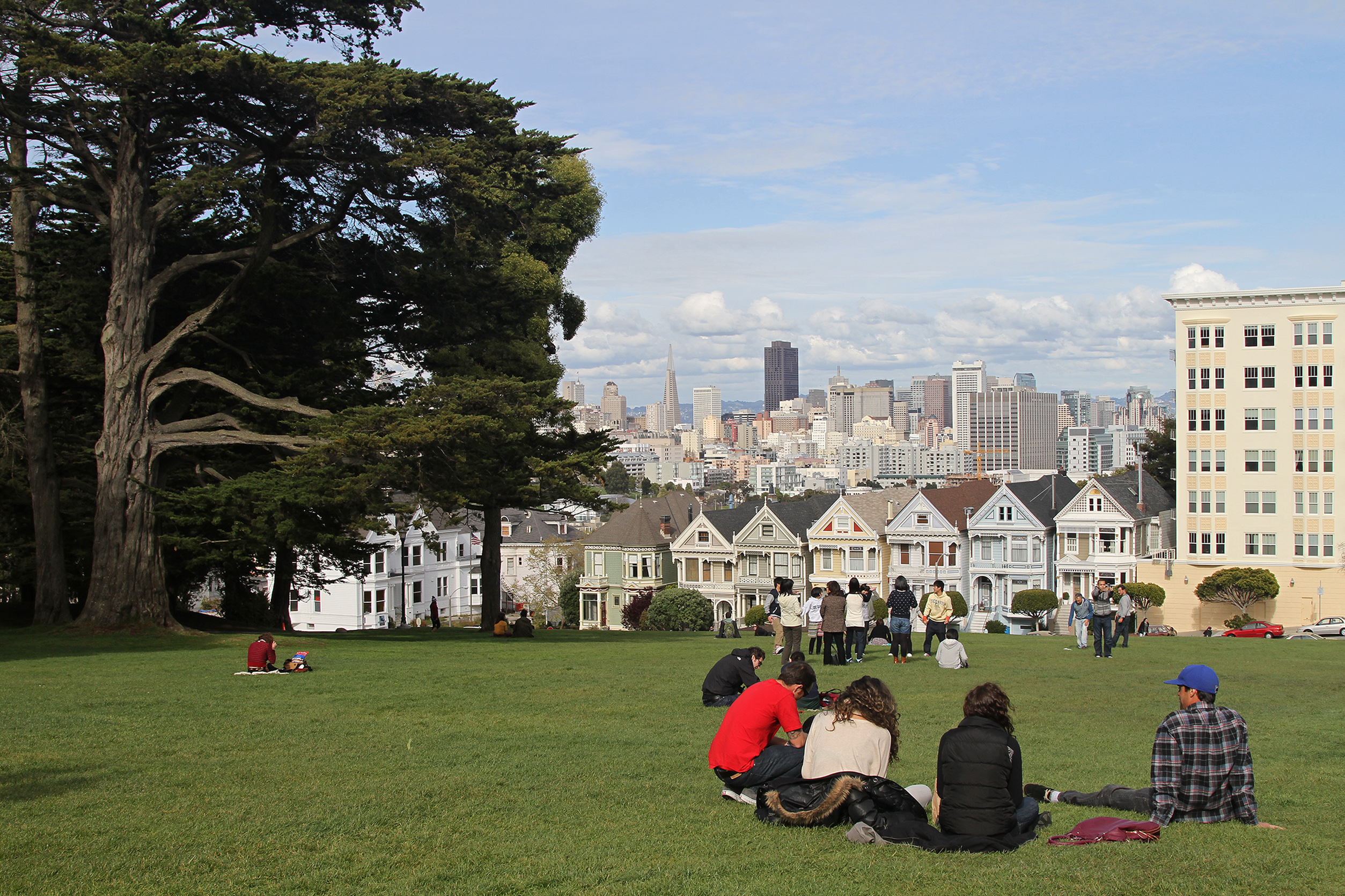
- Looking across Alamo Square Park towards the famous "Painted Ladies" and city skyline
- Interactive map of Alamo Square
- Coordinates: 37.776384°N 122.434709°W
- Country: United States
- State: California
- City and county: San Francisco

Government
  - Supervisor: Bilal Mahmood
  - Assemblymember: Matt Haney (D)
  - State senator: Scott Wiener (D)
  - U. S. rep.: Nancy Pelosi (D)

Area
  - Total: 0.463 sq mi (1.20 km^{2})
  - Land: 0.463 sq mi (1.20 km^{2})

Population (2008)
  - Total: 5,617
  - Density: 31,059/sq mi (11,992/km^{2})
- Time zone: UTC-8 (Pacific)
  - Summer (DST): UTC-7 (PDT)
- ZIP codes: 94115, 94117
- Area codes: 415/628

Alamo Square is a residential neighborhood in San Francisco, California, with a park of the same name. Located in the Western Addition, its boundaries are Buchanan Street on the east, Turk Street on the north, Baker Street on the west, and Page Street Street on the south.

Alamo Square Park, the neighborhood's focal point and namesake, consists of four city blocks at the top of a hill overlooking much of downtown San Francisco, with a number of large and architecturally distinctive mansions along the perimeter, including the "Painted Ladies", a well-known postcard motif. The park is bordered by Hayes Street to the south, Steiner Street to the east, Fulton Street to the north, and Scott Street to the west. Named after the lone cottonwood tree ("álamo" in Spanish), Alamo Hill, was a watering hole on the horseback trail from Mission Dolores to the Presidio in the 1800s. In 1856, Mayor James Van Ness created a 12.7 acres (5.1 ha) park surrounding the watering hole, creating "Alamo Square".

== Attractions and characteristics ==
Alamo Square Park is a 13.6-acre (5.5 ha) public park located in the neighborhood. Open daily from 5am to midnight, it is owned and operated by the San Francisco Recreation & Parks Department. It includes a playground and a tennis court, and is frequented by neighbors, tourists, and dog owners. On a clear day, the Transamerica Pyramid building and the tops of the Golden Gate Bridge and Bay Bridge can be seen from the park's center. The San Francisco City Hall can be seen directly down Fulton Street. The area is part of the city's fifth Supervisorial district and is served by several Muni bus lines, including the 5, 21, 22, and 24. In 2016 it was closed for a $4.3 million renovation lasting seven months.

=== Architecture ===
The Alamo Square neighborhood is characterized by Victorian architecture that was left largely untouched by the urban renewal projects in other parts of the Western Addition. The Alamo Square area contains the second largest concentration of homes over 10,000 square feet (930 m^{2}) in San Francisco, after the Pacific Heights neighborhood.

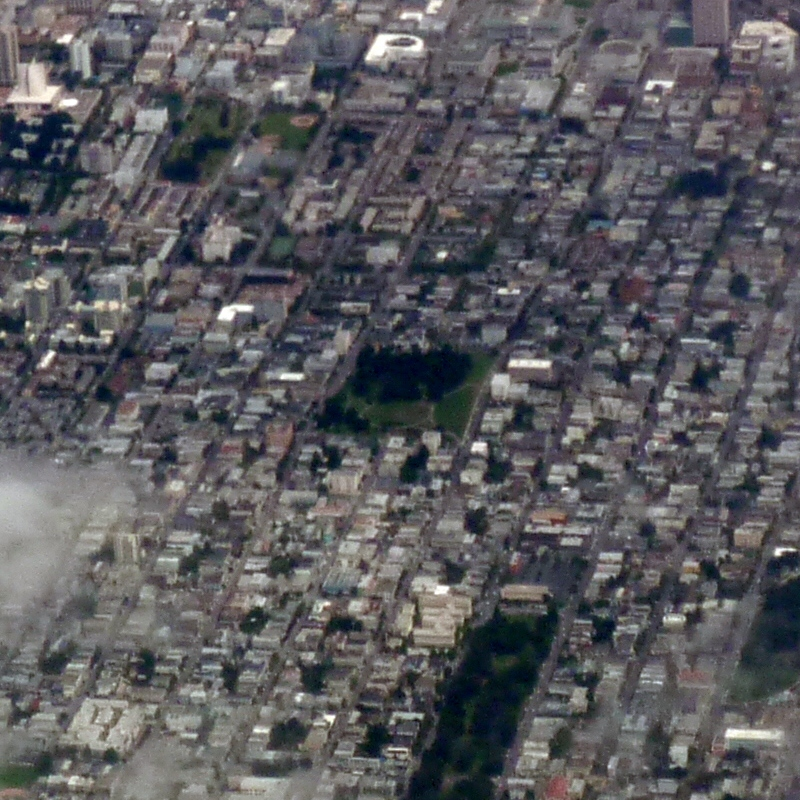
Alamo Square from the air

A row of Victorian houses facing the park on Steiner Street, known as the "Painted Ladies", are often shown in the foreground of panoramic pictures of the city's downtown area. A number of movies, television shows and commercials have been filmed in or around Alamo Square. The park features heavily in the 1978 horror film The Invasion of the Body Snatchers, and the 2012 romantic comedy The Five-Year Engagement. The opening sequence of the American sitcom Full House (1987–1995) features a romp in Alamo Square Park with the famous row of Victorians in the background.

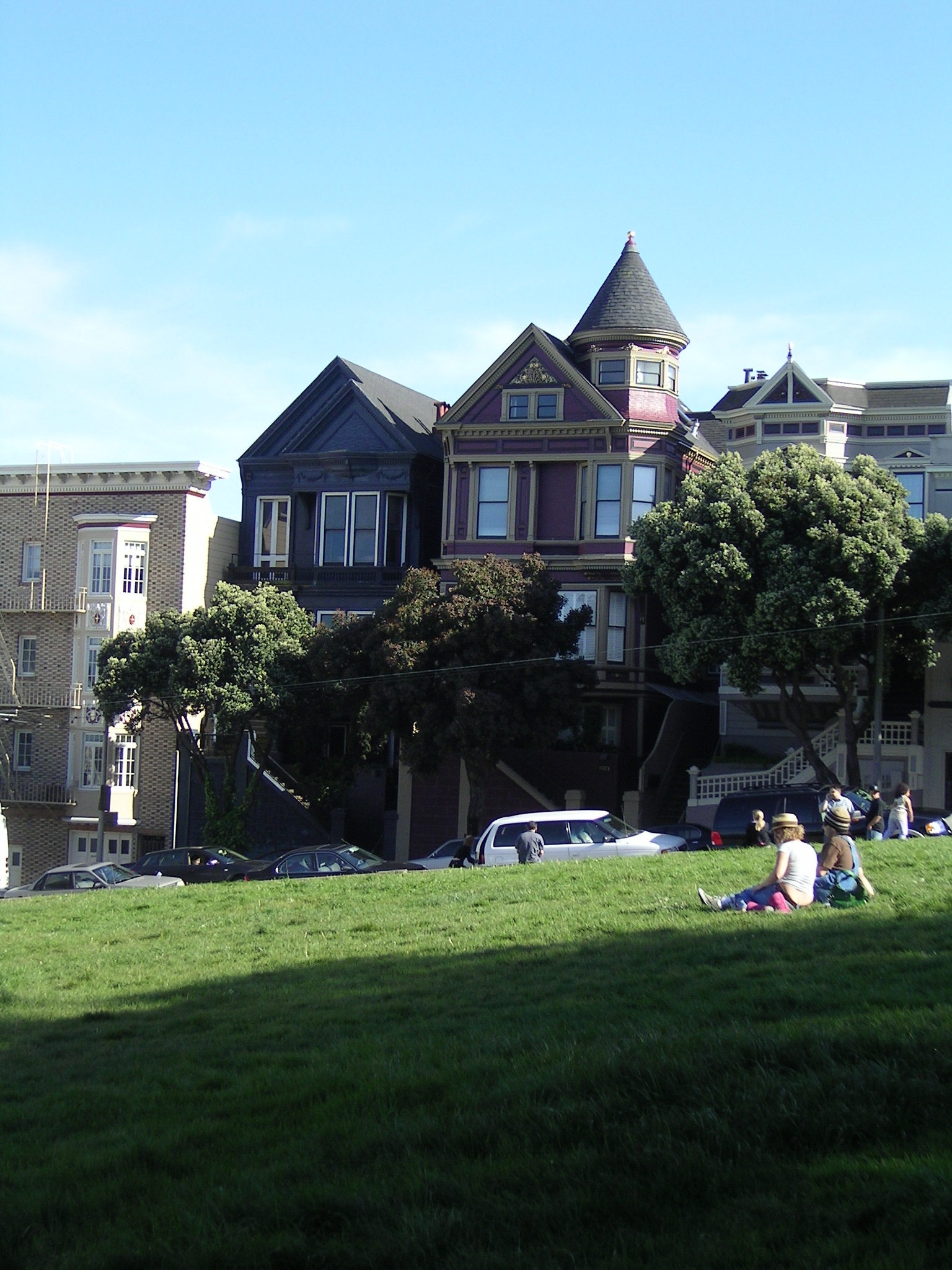
Alamo Square facing south

There are many architecturally significant mansions on the perimeter of the park, including the William Westerfeld House, the Archbishop's Mansion, the residences of the Russian and German Imperial consuls in the early 1900s, and the mansions on the block diagonally across from the Painted Ladies. In 1984, the Alamo Square Historic District was created by the Board of Supervisors, stating:

The Alamo Square Historic District is significant as a continuum of distinguished residential architecture by distinguished architects spanning the period from the 1870s to the 1920s. The towered Westerfield House, the renowned "Postcard Row" with its background of the downtown skyline, and the neighboring streetscapes are as identified worldwide with San Francisco as the cable cars and Coit Tower. With a variety of architectural styles, the District is unified in its residential character, relatively small scale, construction type, materials (principally wood), intense ornamentation (especially at entry and cornice), and use of basements and retaining walls to adjust for hillside sites... With a high degree of integrity to its original designs, the District clearly serves as a visual reminder of how businessmen lived two to four generations ago.

=== Demographics ===
The demographics of the neighborhood are characteristic of other urban neighborhoods that have undergone gentrification: many young people and upper-middle-class homeowners, in addition to a diverse older population. Divisadero Street, which divides Alamo Square from North Panhandle, is home to a number of small businesses including a growing collection of hip and popular restaurants and bars, catering to the young tech professionals who are contributing to the booming San Francisco startup economy, and who value Alamo Square's weather, conveniently central location and easy access to transportation options.

Efforts on the part of Alamo Square and North Panhandle residents and merchants have led to restrictions on chain stores on the corridor.

Neighborhood groups include the Alamo Square Neighborhood Association and the Haight-Divisadero Neighborhood Merchants Association.

=== Notable residents ===
Author Alice Walker lived in one of the "Painted Lady" Victorians across from Alamo Square park up to the mid-1990s.

== See also ==
- Parks of San Francisco
- 49-Mile Scenic Drive
