= Archbishop's Mansion =

Historic house in San Francisco, built 1904

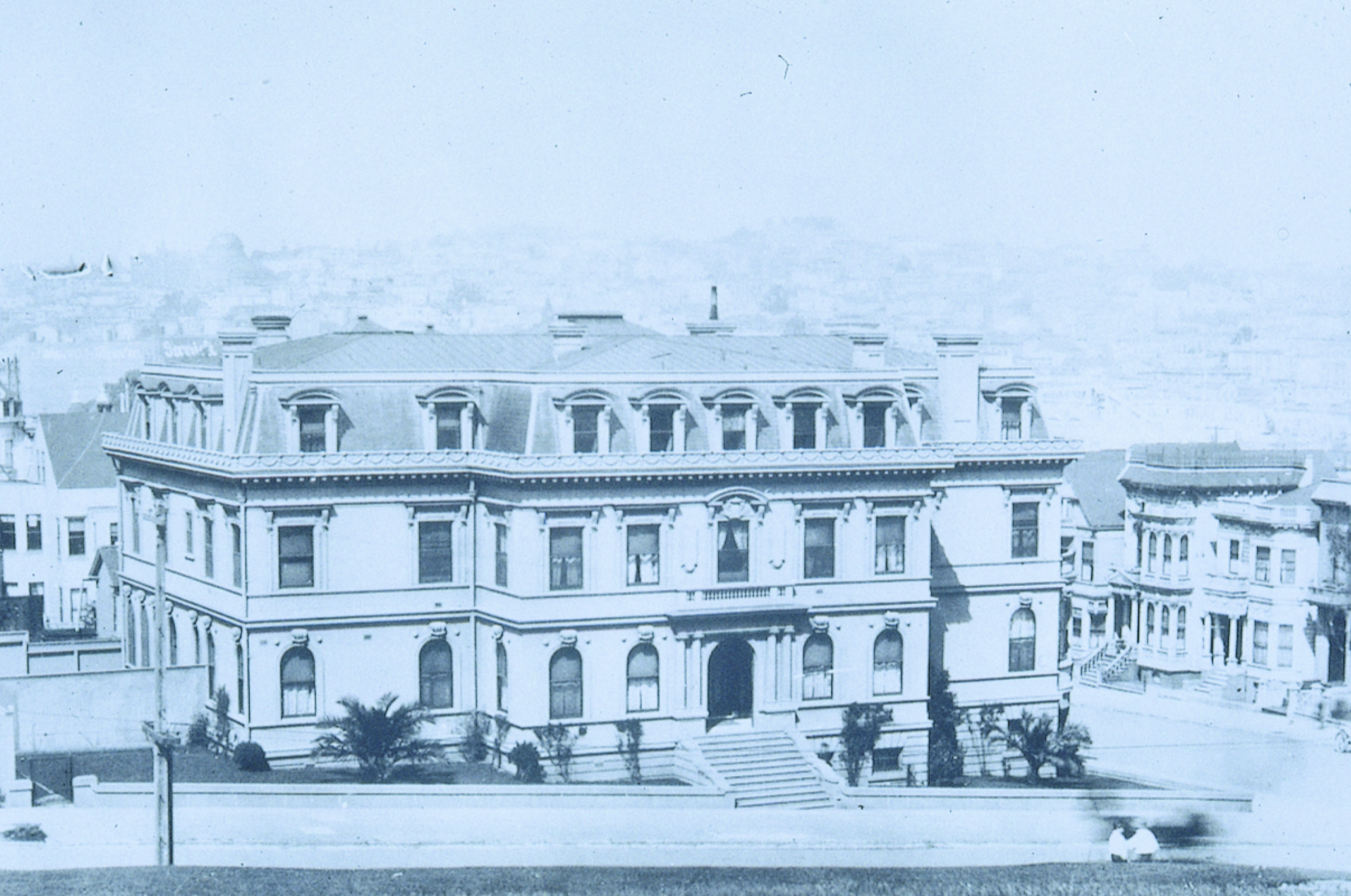

- Location within San Francisco County Location within California
- 37.778316°N 122.433824°W
- Location: 1000 Fulton Street, San Francisco, California, U.S.

Site notes
- Architect: Frank Shea
- Architectural styles: Second Empire-style, French

San Francisco Designated Landmark
- Designated: June 12, 1982
- Reference no.: 151

Archbishop's Mansion is a historic house built in 1904 and located at 1000 Fulton Street in the Alamo Square neighborhood in San Francisco, California. The mansion was built for Patrick William Riordan, the second Roman Catholic Archbishop of San Francisco.

The house is one of the 276 properties named as part of the "Alamo Square Historic District"; designated by the city of San Francisco in July 1984 (planning code, article 10).

== History ==
=== Early years ===
The architect of the building was Frank Shea (1860–1929), who completed the structure in 1904. It was constructed over bedrock and the building has a wood frame and a steel beam substructure; something uncommon in local architecture at the time. The Archbishop's Mansion was designed in the French Second Empire-style and has a redwood (or mahogany) staircase, ornate fireplaces, detailed fixtures, and French doors that open into private bedrooms.

It had 15-bedrooms at the time of building, and operated as a place for visiting clergy. They even hosted Pope Pius XII. In 1906, the Archbishop's Mansion was undamaged after the earthquake. However, after a local convent building for the Sisters of Presentation was damaged in the 1906 earthquake, the nuns moved into the mansion; which was the subject of jokes. The two successor Archbishops also lived in this mansion, Edward Joseph Hanna, and John Joseph Mitty.

=== Working Boys’ Home for Catholic Youth (1944–1974) ===
In 1944, the archbishop residence was moved to 2840 Broadway Street in the Outer Broadway neighborhood between Pacific Heights and Presidio Heights. Between 1944 and 1974, the Archbishop's Mansion operated as a boys Catholic reform school called the "Working Boys’ Home for Catholic Youth", and remained owned by the church.

=== Late years ===
In 1974, the building was sold to UCMC Presbyterian Hospital (later known as Pacific Presbyterian Medical Center, and then merged into California Pacific Medical Center), which used the building as an outpatient psychiatric clinic and hospital offices.

In 1983, the building was converted into an opera-themed bed and breakfast by Jonathan Shannon and Ray Ross. The archbishop's bedroom was designated as a honeymoon suite, known as the "Don Giovani Suite".

In 2010, the mansion was on the real estate market, and sold for US$7 million; at the time it was 13-bedrooms, and 14-bathrooms. In 2018, the building was purposed by a New York-based company and converted into a boho-themed co-living space called, Roam.

Since 2023, the mansion has been rented out in full to a local startup accelerator, Hacker Fellowship Zero.

== See also ==
- List of San Francisco Designated Landmarks
