= Charles Dietle House =

1878 house in San Francisco, California

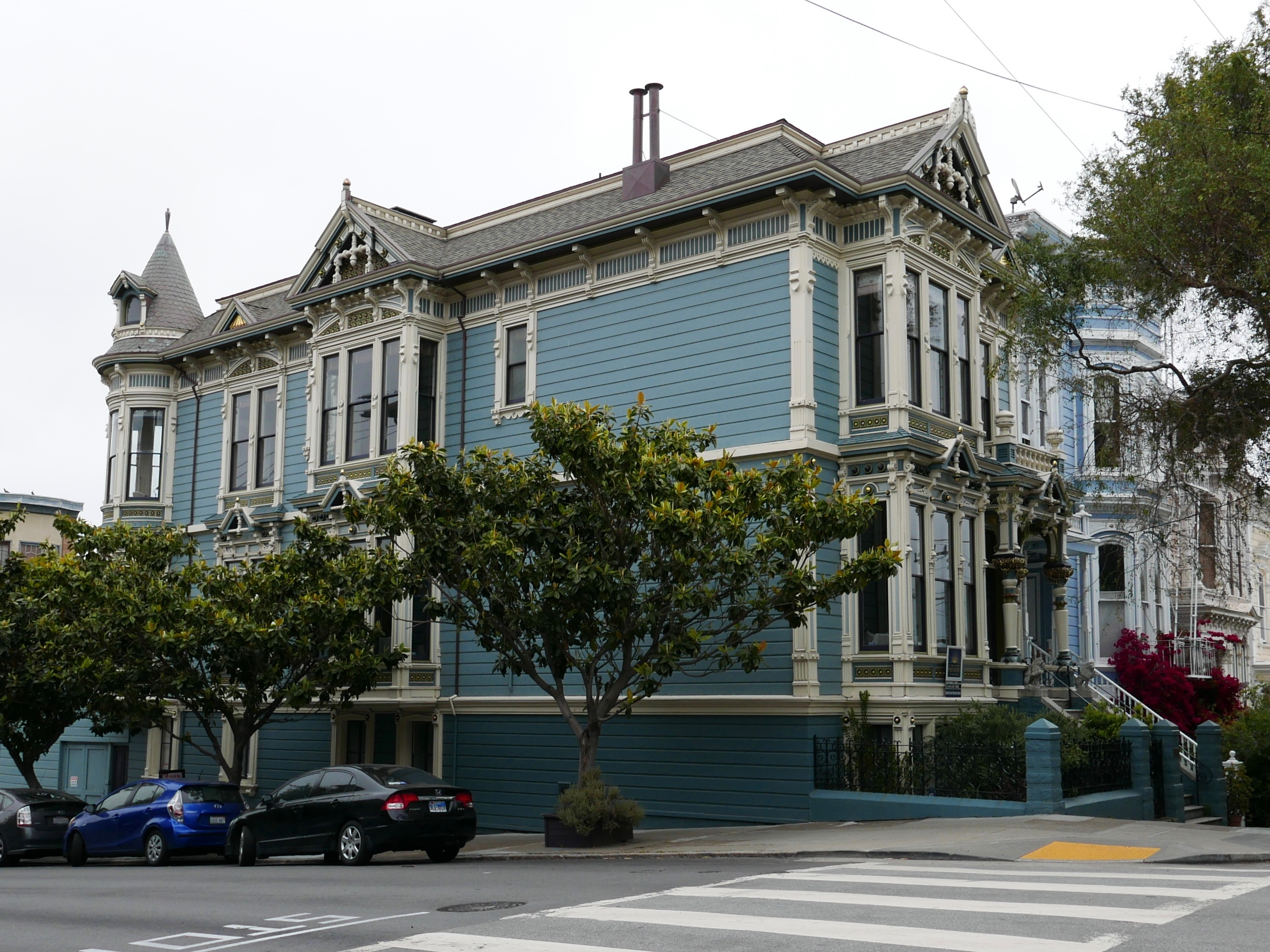

- Location within San Francisco County Location within California
- 37.7738°N 122.4256°W
- Location: 294 Page Street, San Francisco, California, U.S.

History
- Built: 1878
- Built for: Charles Dietle

Site notes
- Architect: Henry Geilfuss
- Architectural style: Stick style

San Francisco Designated Landmark
- Designated: October 1, 1972
- Reference no.: 48

Charles Dietle House, or Dietle House, is a historic building, built in 1878 in the Hayes Valley neighborhood of San Francisco, California. It has been listed as a San Francisco designated landmark since 1972. It is a private house and not open to the public.

== History ==
The Charles Dietle House was designed by architect Henry Geilfuss in 1878, for German-born custom boot maker Charles Dietle. After the 1906 earthquake and fire, the house was in relatively good condition and was sold to John DeMartini, a local fruit and veggie commission merchant and a director of the Bank of Italy (which later became Bank of America).

The Charles Dietle House is five bedrooms, three and a half bathrooms with a roof deck, and is 6,950 square feet (646 m^{2}). It features period details, including a winding main staircase, ornate fireplace mantles, built-in hutches, a dumbwaiter, and a basement ballroom. The building was once used as office space, and has been used as residential since around 2013.

== See also ==
- List of San Francisco Designated Landmarks
- San Francisco Zen Center, the city center building is located across the street
