= Bayview Opera House =

- U.S. National Register of Historic Places
- San Francisco Designated Landmark
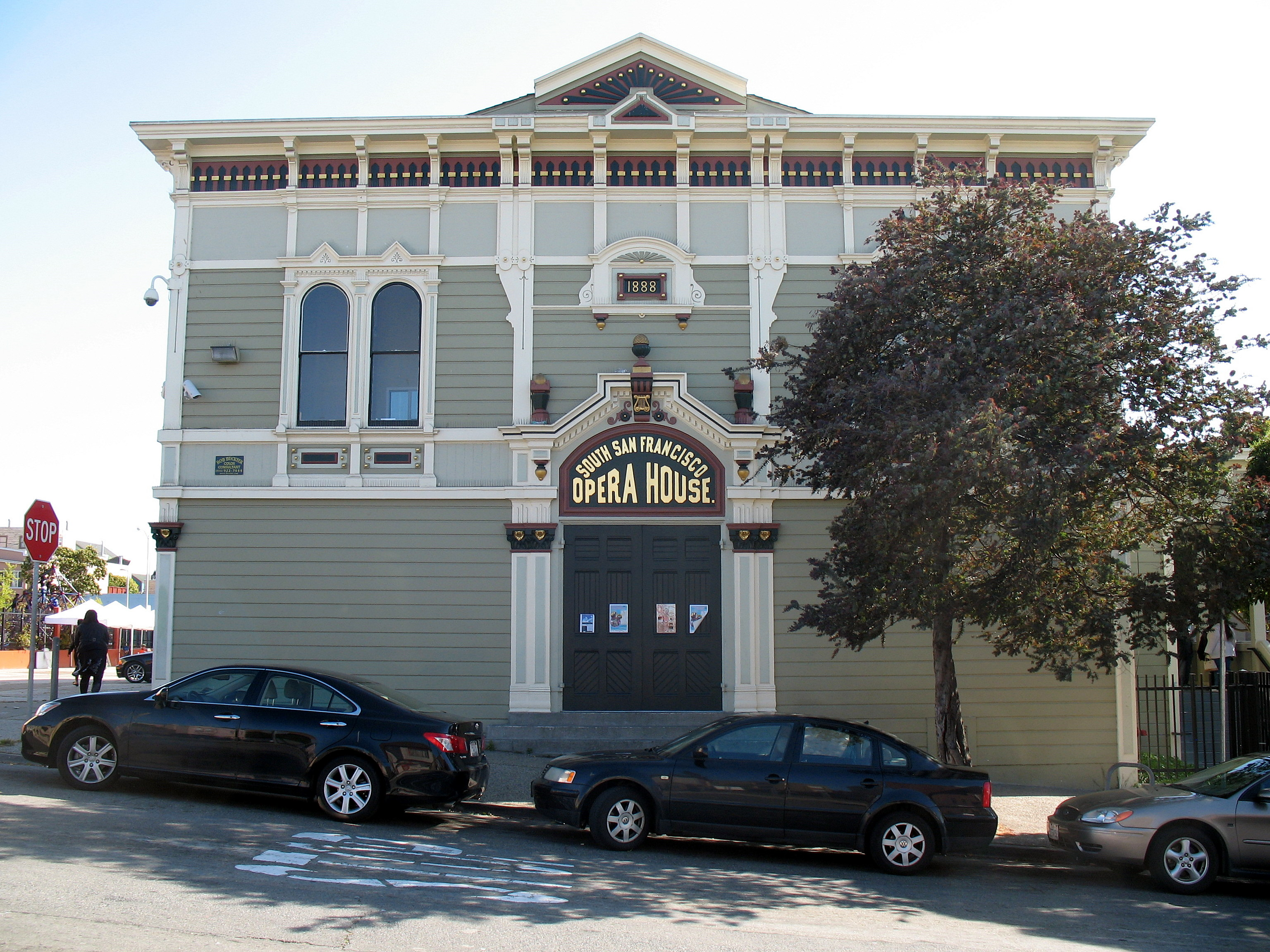
- Bayview Opera House in San Francisco

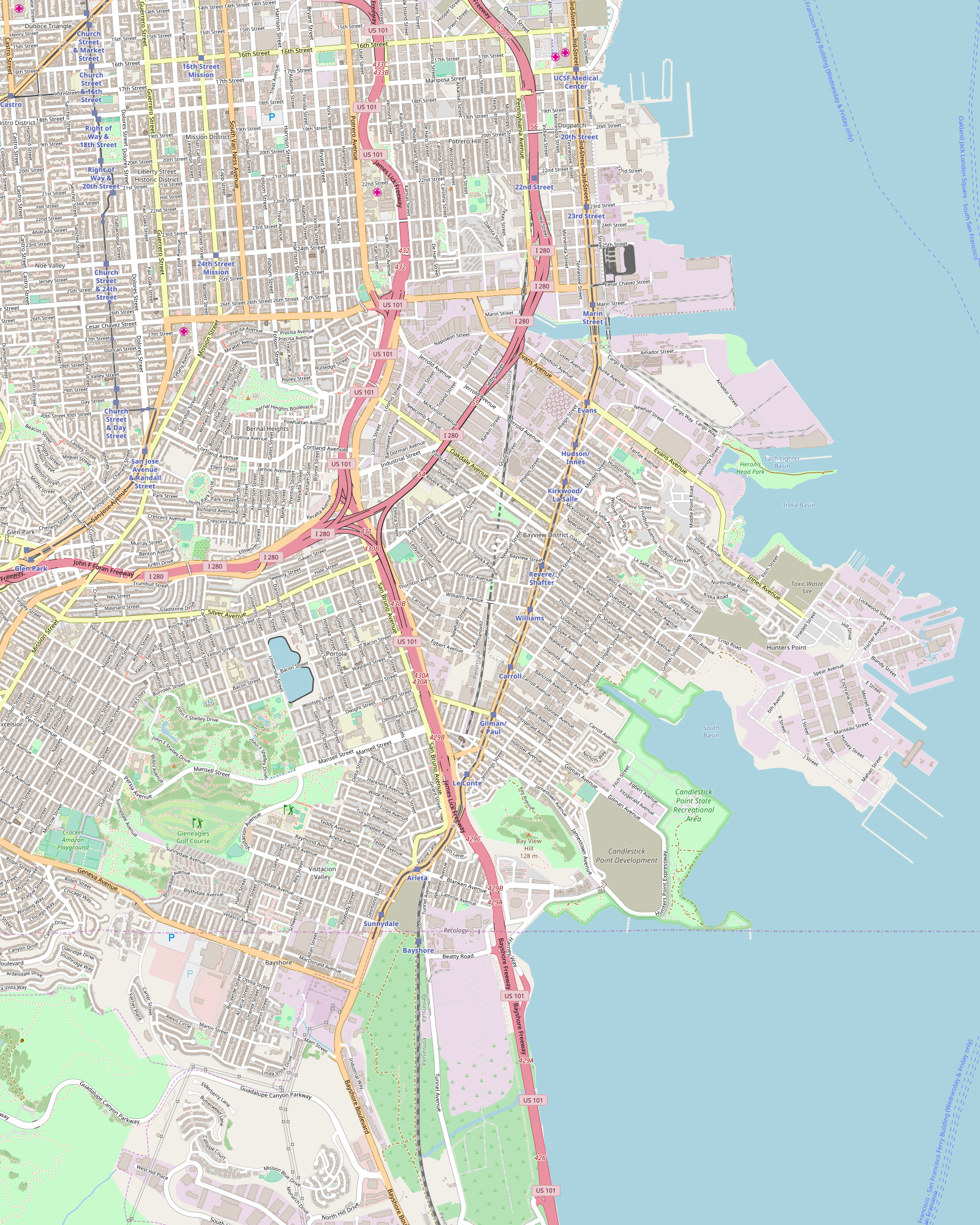
- Location within Bayview-Hunters Point Location within San Francisco County Location within California Location within the United States
- Location: 4705 3rd Street; San Francisco, California; 94124
- Coordinates: 37°44′6.54″N 122°23′24.47″W
- Built: 1888
- Architects: Henry Geilfuss, Cornelius E. Dunshee
- Architectural style: Italianate
- NRHP reference No.: 11000117
- SFDL No.: 8

Significant dates
- Added to NRHP: 21 March 2011
- Designated SFDL: 28 October 1968

The Bayview Opera House, formerly known as the South San Francisco Opera House, is a theatre at 4705 3rd Street in the Bayview-Hunters Point district in San Francisco, California, United States. Founded in 1888, it is reputed to be the oldest existing theatre in the city. From 2014 to 2016, the theatre underwent renovation.

It is officially listed as a City of San Francisco Designated Landmark since October 28, 1968; a California Point of Historical Interest since December 11, 1968; and on March 21, 2011 it was listed on the National Register of Historic Places.

== History ==
The building was designed by architect Henry Geilfuss, one of San Francisco's most prolific architects during the 1880s and 1890s. Geilfuss blended Italianate, Gothic, Eastlake and Stick elements into a style that came to define Victorian architecture in San Francisco.

The theatre is reputed to be the oldest theatre in San Francisco, established in 1888. It survived the 1906 San Francisco earthquake. A Masonic Hall was formerly situated in the lot to the west of the main opera house, but the hall was demolished in 1975 and was replaced with an open-air entrance porch on the west side of the opera house. For many years the hall functioned as a community centre for gatherings and cultural events, and also hosted fairs and political rallies. The Opera House became a listed City of San Francisco landmark on October 28, 1968, and on March 21, 2011 it was listed on the National Register of Historic Places.

The theatre was known for years as the South San Francisco Opera House. It was renamed the Bayview Opera House Ruth Williams Memorial Theatre after producer, playwright and actress Ruth Williams, noted for her roles in launching the careers of singer Cindy Herron and actor Danny Glover. In 2014, it was announced that a $5.3 million renovation project would commence, updating the lobby and upgrading the landscaping and lighting in the interior. The renovation (led by the San Francisco Art Commission, with the budget eventually reaching $5.7 million) added an outdoor stage with permanent seating and made the building ADA accessible, with the theatre's reopening expected for September 2016.

== Facilities ==
The theatre hosts the Community Recording Studio, and is also home to the Bayview Opera House Dance Troupe and the Young and Gifted Choir. It began functioning as a youth and dance center in 1989.

== See also ==
- List of San Francisco Designated Landmarks
- National Register of Historic Places listings in San Francisco
