= Sans Souci Valley =

Coordinates: 37.7696°N 122.4309°W

Sans Souci Valley was the name of a valley in San Francisco, California, in the area corresponding to present day's Lower Haight and Duboce Triangle neighborhoods. This valley once allowed excess storm water to flow from Buena Vista Hill and Lone Mountain (where the University of San Francisco is today), through the Panhandle, to the area located near Duboce Park, along the path today known to cyclists as The Wiggle. The creek was not a surface creek in the dune region except as overflow. The valley’s name, French for "without worry," comes from the Sanssouci Palace built by the Prussian monarch Frederick the Great in Potsdam, Germany.

== Background ==
Sans Souci Valley used to be the easiest walking route connecting Mission Dolores and the Presidio. Hubert Howe Bancroft's History of California, evaluates an assertion by Mariano Vallejo (in Vallejo's Discurso Histórico of October 8, 1876) that the former "Lake Dolores" (or "Laguna de los Dolores") was located "in Sans Souci Valley, north of the Mission". Bancroft's conclusion is that it was not. Research by Christopher Richard has since shown that Lake Dolores was one and the same as the wide area of Mission Creek. Research by Joel Pomerantz has shown that other vernal lakes did exist at the location in Sans Souci Valley described by Vallejo.

In the 19th century, the spelling was variable between Sans Souci and San Souci, with some maps including both.

== See also ==
- Hydrography of the San Francisco Bay Area
- List of watercourses in the San Francisco Bay Area
