= Duboce Park Landmark District =

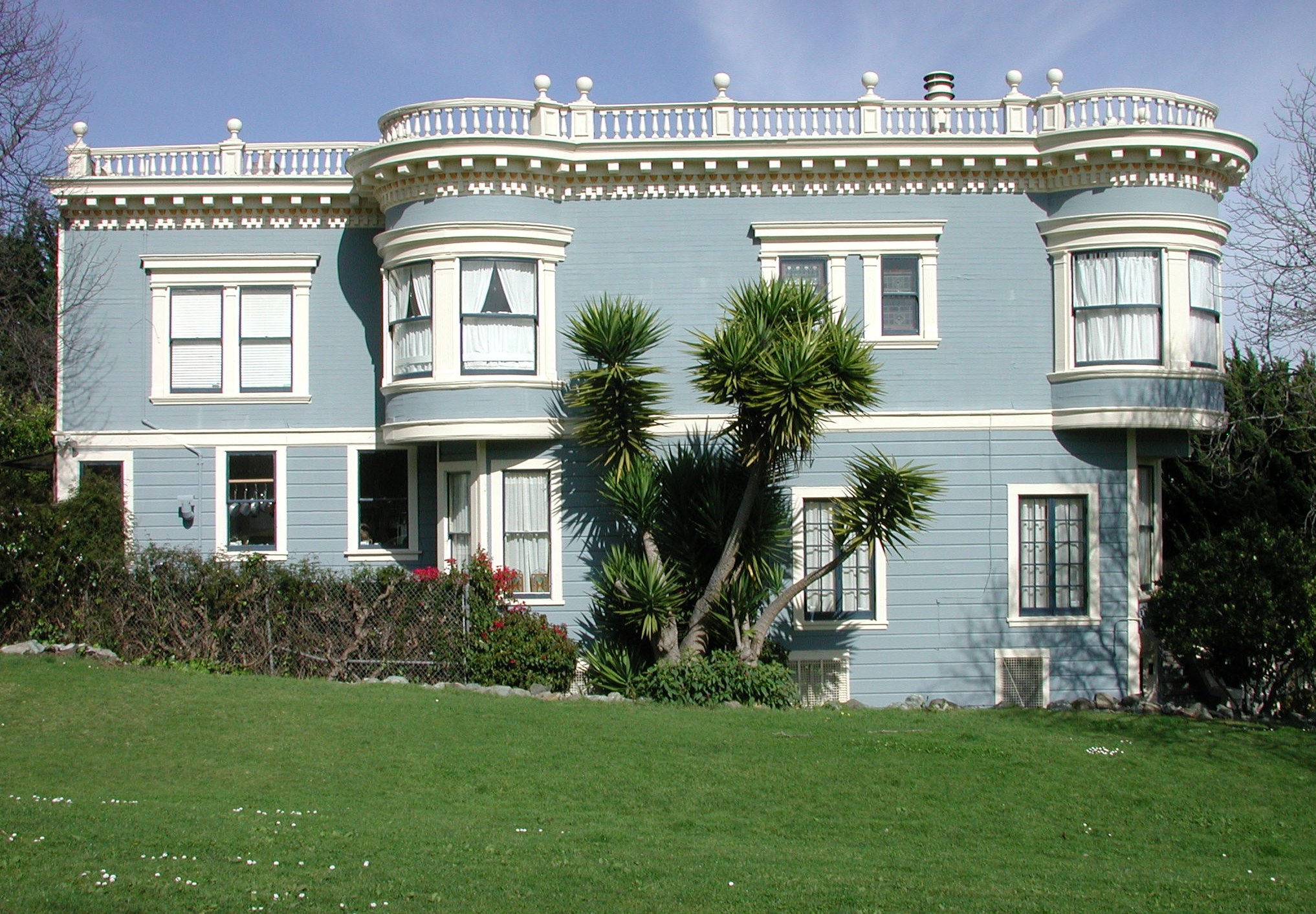
- Home located along Duboce Park

- Location within Central San Francisco
- Coordinates: 37.7698°N 122.4334°W

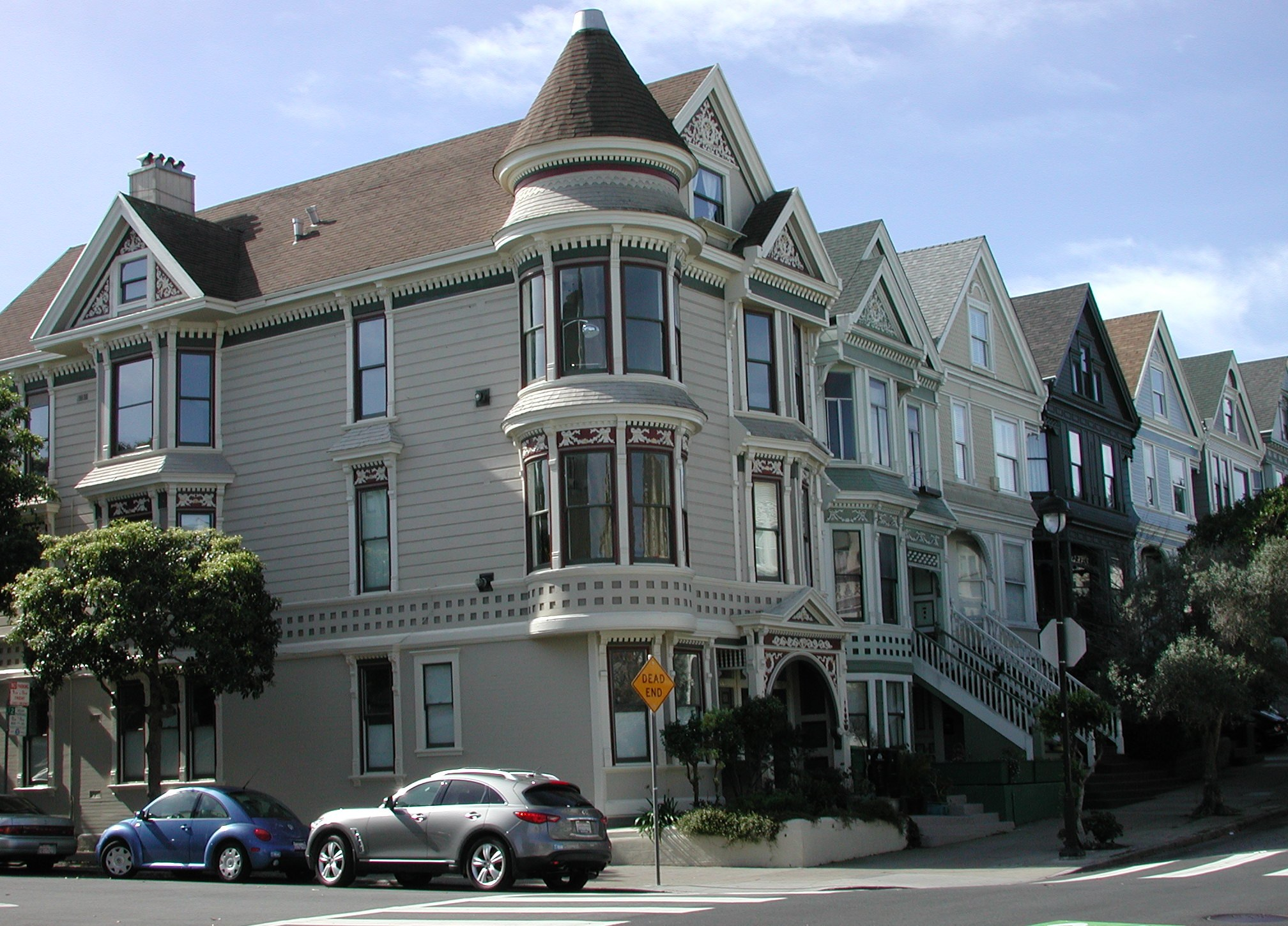
Homes on Waller Street at Pierce Street

Duboce Park Landmark District is a residential section in the Duboce Triangle neighborhood in San Francisco, California. One of 12 Landmark Districts within San Francisco, it occupies 4 city blocks with 90 properties, as well as Duboce Park. It features well-preserved, Victorian- and Edwardian-era homes, many in the Queen Anne style. Most of the district was constructed between 1899 and 1905 by Fernando Nelson, a prolific builder known for his lively ornamentation. The district is bordered by Duboce Avenue to the south, Waller Street to the north, Scott Street to the west, and Steiner Street to the east.

== See also ==
- Duboce Park
- Duboce Triangle, San Francisco
