= Robert Ingersoll Aitken =

American sculptor (1878–1949)

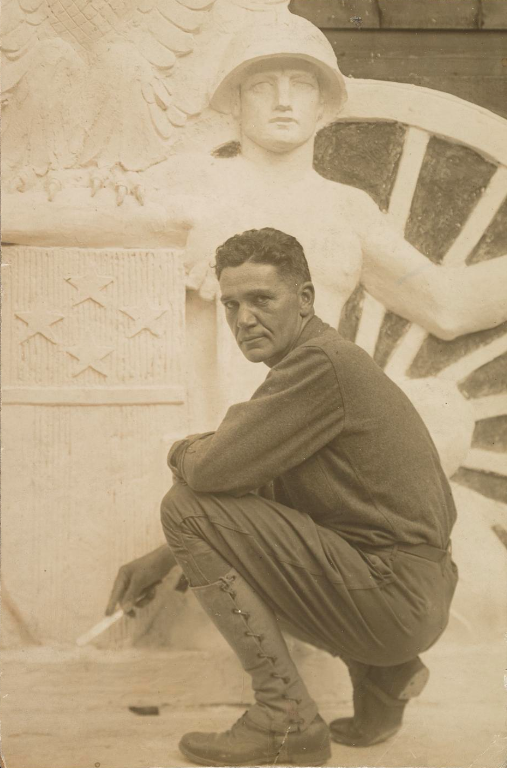
- Aitken with one of his sculptures, c. 1920
- Born: May 8, 1878; San Francisco, California, US
- Died: January 3, 1949 (aged 70); New York City, US
- Known for: Sculpture

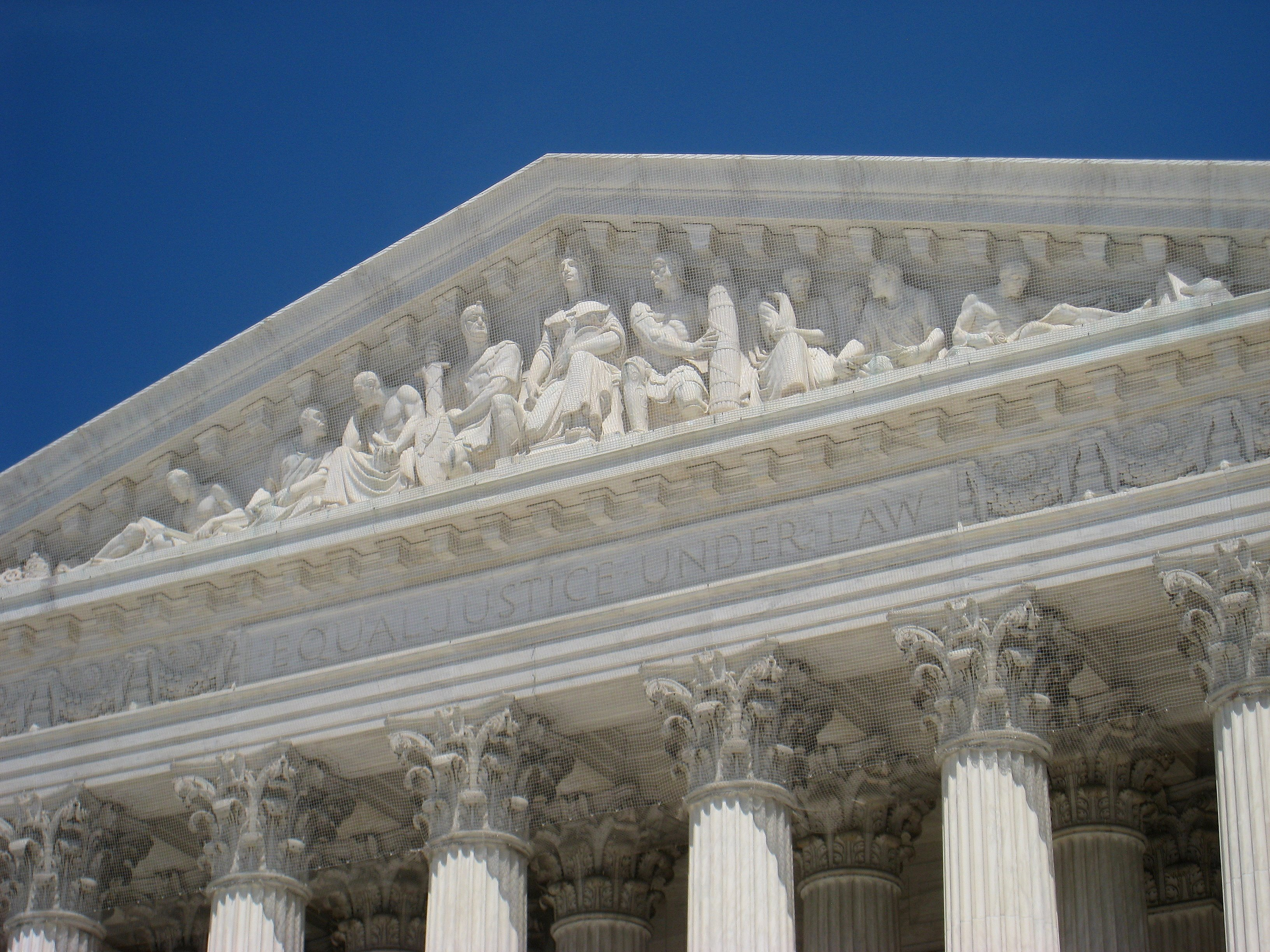
Equal Justice Under Law, the West Pediment of the Supreme Court in Washington, D.C., by Robert Aitken.

Robert Ingersoll Aitken (May 8, 1878 – January 3, 1949) was an American sculptor. Perhaps his most famous work is the West Pediment of the United States Supreme Court Building.

== Life and career ==
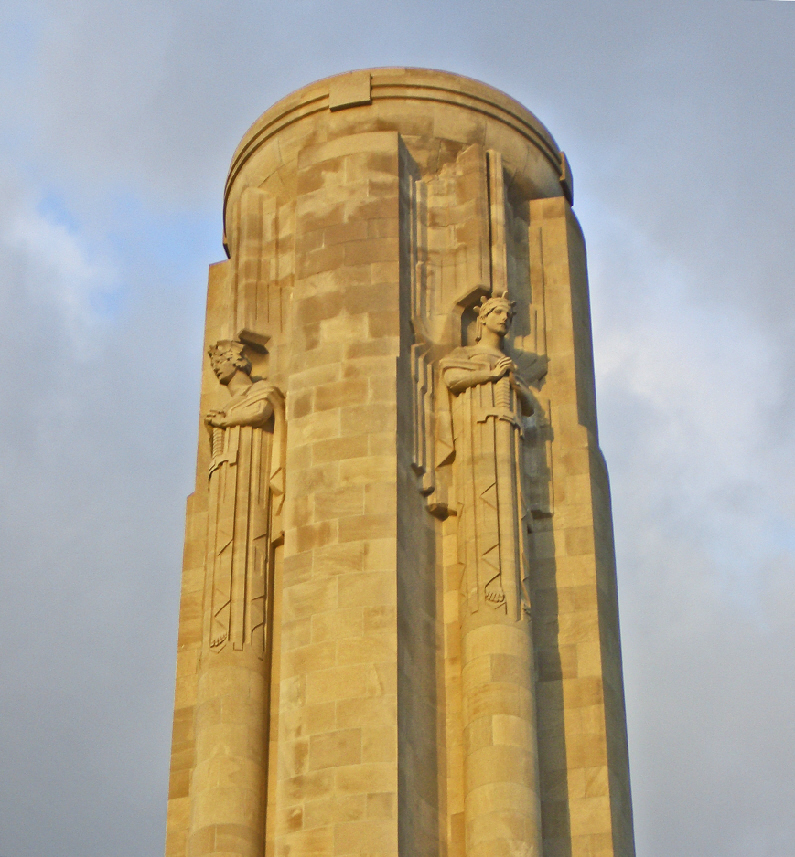
Sculptural details at the top of the 217 ft. column of the Liberty Memorial in Kansas City, Missouri.

Born to Charles H. Aitken and Katherine A. Higgens in San Francisco, California, Aitken studied there at the Mark Hopkins Institute of Art [also called the California School of Design – now the San Francisco Art Institute] with Douglas Tilden. From 1901 until 1904 he was an instructor at the Institute.

During this period, Aitken in 1900 designed San Francisco's original municipal flag; the design was in use from 1900 until sometime in the early 1920s.

In 1903, he sculpted the Victory figure for the top of the Dewey Monument, which still stands in San Francisco's Union Square.

In 1904, Aitken carved a 15-foot (4.6 m) statue of a female figure, representing the Republic for the William McKinley Memorial, which still stands in the San Francisco Panhandle Park.

In 1904, Aitken moved to Paris where he continued his studies. He returned to New York City after his sojourn in Paris and was employed as an instructor at the Art Students League. Eleanor Mary Mellon was among his pupils.

His works include the Science fountain and Great Rivers statues at the Missouri State Capitol, the Iron Mike statue at Parris Island, South Carolina, several military sculptures at West Point and the Temple of Music, and sculptural works for the Liberty Memorial in Kansas City, Missouri. Aitken also produced the Fountain of Earth for San Francisco's Panama Pacific Exposition.

Perhaps his most famous work is the West Pediment of the United States Supreme Court Building, which bears the inscription "Equal Justice Under Law". The sculpture, above the entrance to the Supreme Court Building, is of nine figures—the goddess of Liberty surrounded by figures representing Order, Authority, Council, and Research. These allegorical figures were in fact sculptures of real people who had a role in the creation of the building. Aitken himself is depicted in the pediment, seated to the proper left of Liberty with Chief Justice Charles Evans Hughes. Many of his works were carved by the Piccirilli Brothers, including the pieces for the National Archives Building.

Aitken created a stir when he criticized the display and placement of the Venus de Milo. His work was also part of the sculpture event in the art competition at the 1928 Summer Olympics.

== Medallic and coin design ==
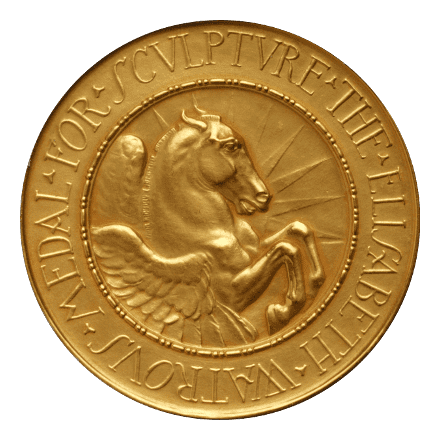
Elizabeth Watrous Medal for Sculpture, commissioned by the National Academy of Design in 1914.

Aitken also enjoyed success as a designer of coins and medals. He sculpted the $50 gold commemorative (round and octagonal) for the Panama-Pacific Exposition of 1915, as well as the official medal of the event. He also created the Missouri Centennial half dollar of 1921, following it a decade and a half later with the California Pacific International Exposition half dollar of 1935–1936. In the medallic arena, Aitken sculpted the American Numismatic Society's 1921 medal commemorating Marshal Foch's visit to the United States; the 15th issue of the Society of Medalists Omnia Vincit Amor, 1937; the Medal of the National Academy of Design; and the Medal of the National Sculpture Society.

== See also ==
- George Rogers Clark (sculpture, 1921)
- Samuel Gompers Memorial
- Lumbermen Monument
- William A. Starke Memorial
