= John McNaught (writer) =

American writer and editor

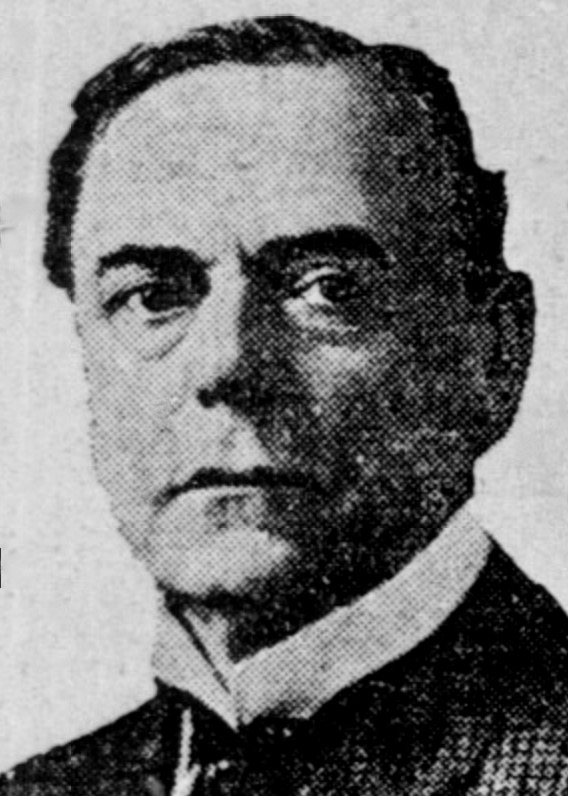
- John McNaught (1905)
- Born: February 2, 1849; Newport, Wakulla County, Florida, US
- Died: 12 March 1938 (aged 89); San Jose, California, US
- Occupation(s): Writer, editor
- Spouse(s): Elma Bland (1892); Margaret Everitt Schallenberger (1915)

John McNaught (February 2, 1849 – March 12, 1938) was a newspaper writer and editor of The Sacramento Union and The San Francisco Call; he was the personal secretary to Joseph Pulitzer of the New York World. He was an accomplished writer and public speaker in San Francisco.

== Early life ==
McNaught was born in Newport, Florida, on February 2, 1849. He graduated from Harvard Law School. He married Elma Bland on April 13, 1892, in Santa Clara, California. They were wed for 22 years. She died on April 30, 1914. On October 29, 1915, at age 66, he married Dr. Margaret Everitt Schallenberger (1862–1951) at her pioneer home near San Jose, California.

== Professional background ==
John McNaught had an extensive journalistic career in which he developed a knowledge of national and state affairs. He started as editor on The San Francisco Call in 1895, when Charles M. Shortridge purchased the paper. He became general manager of the Call on October 1, 1903.

On January 24, 1903, McNaught gave a eulogy for the 144th anniversary of the birth of Scottish poet and lyricist Robert Burns. Some five thousand people were present at the Mechanics' Pavilion, representing four Scottish societies.

On December 9, 1903, McNaught, as manager of the San Francisco Call, spoke on the topic, "Why San Francisco Should Make a Special Display at the St. Louis Exposition." Mayor Eugene Schmitz and M. H. de Young also spoke. McNaught said that a display at the Exposition would "be necessary to demonstrate to the world the importance of the city as a commercial and an industrial center."

McNaught was a speaker when the William McKinley Memorial was unveiled on November 24, 1904, at the entrance to the Panhandle at Golden Gate Park. More than five thousand people attended.

On October 19, 1905, McNaught traveled to New York to give a speech at the Astor Gallery of the Waldorf-Astoria for the International Advertising Association. McNaught spoke about having a convention in San Francisco and how world politics were centering in the Pacific.

McNaught retired from the San Francisco Call in 1906 after a dozen years at the newspaper. During the 1906 San Francisco earthquake and fire, McNaught became a member of Mayor Eugene Schmitz's Committee of Fifty. Afterward, he worked on other newspapers in Alaska and went to New York to work under Joseph Pulitzer of the New York World from 1907 to 1912. He traveled to many countries as Pulitzer's personal secretary. After he left The Evening World, he became editor of the New York Morning World, through 1915.

When he married his second wife, Margaret Schallenberger, in 1915, McNaught moved back to California, where he became editor of The Sacramento Union.

In February 1916 McNaught gave a series of lectures on journalism at the University of California.

McNaught was a member of the Bohemian Club and the Press Club of San Francisco.

== Death ==
McNaught died on March 12, 1938, at the age of 89, in San Jose, California. He was buried at the Oak Hill Memorial Park in that city.

== See also ==
- List of Bohemian Club members
- Committee of Fifty (1906)
