= Monjett Graham =

American visual artist (born 1946)

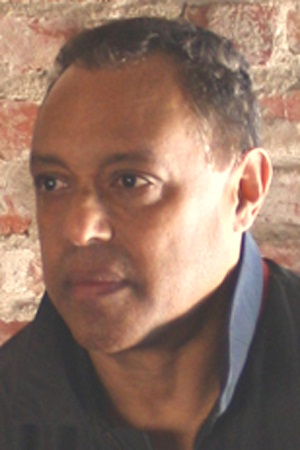
- Monjett Graham (2012)
- Born: Monjett Willis Graham; 1946 (age 79–80); Omaha, Nebraska, U.S.
- Education: University of Nebraska–Lincoln (BA), Lone Mountain College (MA)
- Occupation: Visual artist
- Known for: Painting, printmaking, mixed media collage, comics
- Website: Official website

Monjett Graham (born 1946) is an American contemporary visual artist and writer. His work addresses topics such as spirituality and African American history. Graham is known for his paintings, prints, and mixed media collage work.

== Early life and education ==
Monjett Graham, was born in 1946, in Omaha, Nebraska. His father was Richard Graham, a government meat inspector. He graduated in 1964 from Omaha North High School.

Graham obtained a bachelor's degree from the University of Nebraska–Lincoln. Graham then went on to complete his Masters degree in psychology and art in 1974 from the Lone Mountain College. Graham continued his education at the University of Toronto, the San Francisco Art Institute, and the Academy of Art University.

== 1970s ==
Graham moved to San Francisco, California in October 1969, from Omaha, Nebraska. In the early 1970s he wrote a regular column on culture for the Sun-Reporter, an African American newspaper in San Francisco. He also contributed artwork to The Rip Off Review of Western Culture magazine comic; two pieces were published in the first issue. The first drawing was entitled "Urban Mood" created with a single woodcut and pencil. The second drawing was created with woodcuts only, three soldiers, entitled "Occupation". The subject matter, at that time was social commentary and surrealistic landscapes.

In 1970, Graham had his first one man exhibition, The Fire Cycle at Lone Mountain College in San Francisco. Graham became an exhibiting member of the BlackMan's Art Gallery on Haight Street in San Francisco, which was the first African American owned art gallery in Northern California.

"Wide Awake" is a painting from the Fantasy Landscapes series, 1970s

Fantasy Landscapes

In 1976, Graham moved from San Francisco to Sausalito, California, and then a year later moved to Mill Valley, California. In the mid-1970s Graham started "Fantasy Landscapes" series, which consisted of exotic or mysterious landscapes often punctuated by temples, pyramids or ancient buildings. Sometimes these paintings were accented with a single expressive character to embellish the scenario with specific attitude.

== 1980s ==
Graham created portraits of historical, military leaders from around the world, using pencil and conte as a medium. These drawings were then applied to T-shirts and sportswear via silk screen. This fashioned a marketable commodity, which involved a mail order business, complete with a color catalogue, that supplied retail buyers and sports shops across America. The business, incorporated in 1981, known as the "California Corporation" advertised in major nationwide magazines such as Soldier of Fortune, American Handgunner and Guns and Ammo. Eventually, it also included illustrations of warplanes and military vehicles. The business due to increased competition, ended in the late 1980s. During this time Graham also expanded his artwork to a mixed media collage technique, which he used paper, thin bits of fabric on canvas. He would then experiment with larger objects, such as wood panel, leather, metal and plastic parts, as well as boots, and entire pieces of clothing. Starting out as abstract imagery, Monjett's mixed media collage technique evolved into illustrating animals and a variety of scenarios involving the human form.

== 1990s ==
Graham created several series of mixed media collage paintings throughout the 1990s. The first completed series was the "Music Series" which was first exhibited in 1991 at the Piazza Gallery in Sausalito, California. This is an ongoing series still in production, which portrays music in the United States as medium of stage entertainment. Other series done in the mixed media collage technique were the "Religion Series" and the "Sports Series" and the "Black Holocaust" series. The "Black Holocaust" series was exhibited in 1995 at Jahn Arts International in Minneapolis, Minnesota. The series illustrated the historical narrative of the West African slave trade.

"No Surrender" 2012 Series

== Early 2000 works of art ==
Graham has worked on the "Music Series" mixed media collage paintings and completed a series of paintings entitled "2010" which are all abstract expressionist paintings on canvas. Graham uses only three colors of acrylic paint with the "2010" series, and has worked with the paintings as if the canvas was an uneven, textured stone wall or cave interior.

=== 2012 ===
The ongoing study of Chinese calligraphy led Graham to incorporate that ancient system of pictograms into the design of his abstract expressionist painting. In September 2012, Graham exhibited, at the Joyce Gordon Gallery in Oakland California. These works of art were the first products of this unusual blending of style, technique and Chinese imagery into a series of colorful and rhythmic paintings. Completed in a specific order beginning with the abstract painting as a foundation, Graham integrated the calligraphy character into the painting as it neared completion. As the series progressed the calligraphy figures evolved as larger and more dominant features of the paintings. The last few works of the series allowed the calligraphy to be the foundation of the paintings and even overflowing off the canvases so that only a portion of the Chinese characters are discernible. This dominant feature of one or more calligraphy characters, combined with colorful abstraction is the current direction of Monjett's abstract expressionist paintings. From his newly opened studio in Beijing China, Graham is inspired, daily, to explore and open new pathways for the integration of Western Abstract painting and the ancient language and imagery of Chinese calligraphy.

== Exhibitions ==
Year	Exhibition Type	Exhibitions	Location	Notes
2012	Solo	Monjett Graham (Transfiguration), Joyce Gordon Gallery, September 7, 2012	Oakland, California	
2011	Solo	Monjett Graham Selected Paintings, Cassandra Kersting Expressions Gallery, October 22, 2011,	Sausalito, California	
2011	Solo	Monjett Graham Selected Paintings, Joe Hamer Salon, September 6, 2011	Mill Valley, California	
2008	Group	Paintings, Art and Soul Gallery, November 2008	Burlingame, California	
2006	Solo	New Paintings 2006, paintings, O'Hanlon Center for the Arts, August 1 thru 31, 2006	Mill Valley, California	
2005	Group	group exhibition – paintings, Art and Soul Gallery, August 2005	San Francisco, California	
2005	Solo	Selected Paintings and Prints, Fillmore Jazz Festival, July 2 and 3, 2005	San Francisco, California	
2004	Solo	Recent Paintings, Marin Open Studios, May 7 and 8, 2005	Mill Valley, California	
2004	Group	"Art and Politics", paintings and cartoons, O'Hanlon Center for the Arts, Oct 5 thru October 31, 2004	Mill Valley, California	
2004	Solo	"Selected Paintings", paintings, dava dava salon San Francisco, CA., May 19 thru June 30, 2004	San Francisco, California	
2003	Solo	Recent Paintings: "Games and Luck", Toby's Gallery, April 5 through April 30, 2003	Point Reyes Station, California	
2002	Group	"It Figures", Marin County Civic Center, October 21 – December 12, 2002	San Rafael, California	
1999	Solo	"Man, Woman, and Mythology", solo exhibition of mixed-media paintings, Gallery Dog, August 7 through August 31, 1999	Eureka, California	
1999		Heart of Care Inc. artist-in-residence grants four-week summer arts project, funded by the Nebraska Arts Council, July 5 through August 1, 1999	Omaha, Nebraska	
1999	Group	"1999 Regional Invitational", sponsored by Humboldt State University First Street Gallery	Eureka, California	
1999	Solo	Musical World, solo exhibition, mix-media paintings and giclee prints, Plaza Design, January 8 – February 28, 1999	Arcata, California	
1999	Group	7th Annual Marin Arts Council Members Exhibition, paintings and limited edition prints, Corte Madera Town Center, November 14 – December 17, 1999	Corte Madera, California	
1999	Group	"Windows on the Waterfront", group exhibition paintings, Jack London Square, September 3 through December 31, 1998	Oakland, California	
1998	Group	Annual Group Exhibition, paintings, Shamwari Gallery, September 3 through October 30	Oakland, California	
1997	Group	"Windows on Art", group exhibition, Alameda Historical Society Museum	Alameda, California	
1997	Solo	"Exploring Collage", solo exhibition, Mill Valley Art Commission at Mill Valley City Hall, June 1 through June 30, 1997	Mill Valley, California	
1996	Group	group exhibition – paintings, HAND Contemporary Arts, October 24 through December 19, 1996	San Francisco, California	
1995	Group	Kwanza Exhibition, group exhibition, Hennepin County Government Center, December 3 through January 3, 1995	Minneapolis, Minnesota	
	Group	"Jazz and Blues Night", group exhibition, Sunrise Gallery, October 14 through December 3	San Francisco, California	
	Solo	"The Black Holocaust", Jahn Arts International, July 9 through August 30	Minneapolis, Minnesota	
	Group	"Intersecting Cultural Lines", Normandale Community College, January 26 through March 1	Bloomington, Minnesota	
	Group	"Collector's Delight", Sunrise Gallery, December 3 through January 14	San Francisco, California	
	Solo	"Recent Paintings", Frank Howard Allen Peal Estate Office, November 7 through January 31	Mill Valley, California	
1992	Solo	"Light & Rhythm 1992", paintings, Gallery Piazza, December 18 through March 15	Sausalito, California	
	Solo	Paintings, Edward S. Curtis Gallery, February 28 through March 25	San Anselmo, California	
1990	Solo	Recent Work, Merced College Art Gallery, September 4 through 21	Merced, California	
1990	Two person	Mixed Media: Two Perspectives: Monjett Graham and Shirley Rae Parini, Pro-Arts Tempspace Gallery, July 11 through August 25	Oakland, California	
1990	Group, juried	"Exhibition ‘90", Sun Gallery, April 18 through 23	Hayward, California	
	Group	Paintings, Hatley Martin Gallery, January 11 through February 28	San Francisco, California	
	Group	Paintings, Fort Mason	San Francisco, California	
	Solo	Paintings and Prints, Metes and Bounds	Sausalito, California	
	Group	Prints, San Francisco Artists Cooperative	San Francisco, California	
	Solo	Paintings, New Day Gallery	San Francisco, California	
	Group	Paintings, Union Street Artist's Co-op	San Francisco, California	
	Group	Paintings, Brockman Gallery	Los Angeles, California	
1974	Group	Afro-American Culture Week, Napa Valley College	Napa, California	
1973	Group	Les Ballet Africains, paintings, BlackMan's Art Gallery	San Francisco, California	
		Paintings, Sun Gallery	San Francisco, California	
1971	Solo	The Fire Cycle, paintings, prints, and drawings, Newman Hall Gallery	Berkeley, California	
1970	Group	The Fire Cycle, paintings and woodcuts, Lone Mountain College	San Francisco, California	
	Group	Paintings, Richmond Art Center	Richmond, California	
