= William McKinley Memorial =

Memorial in San Francisco, California

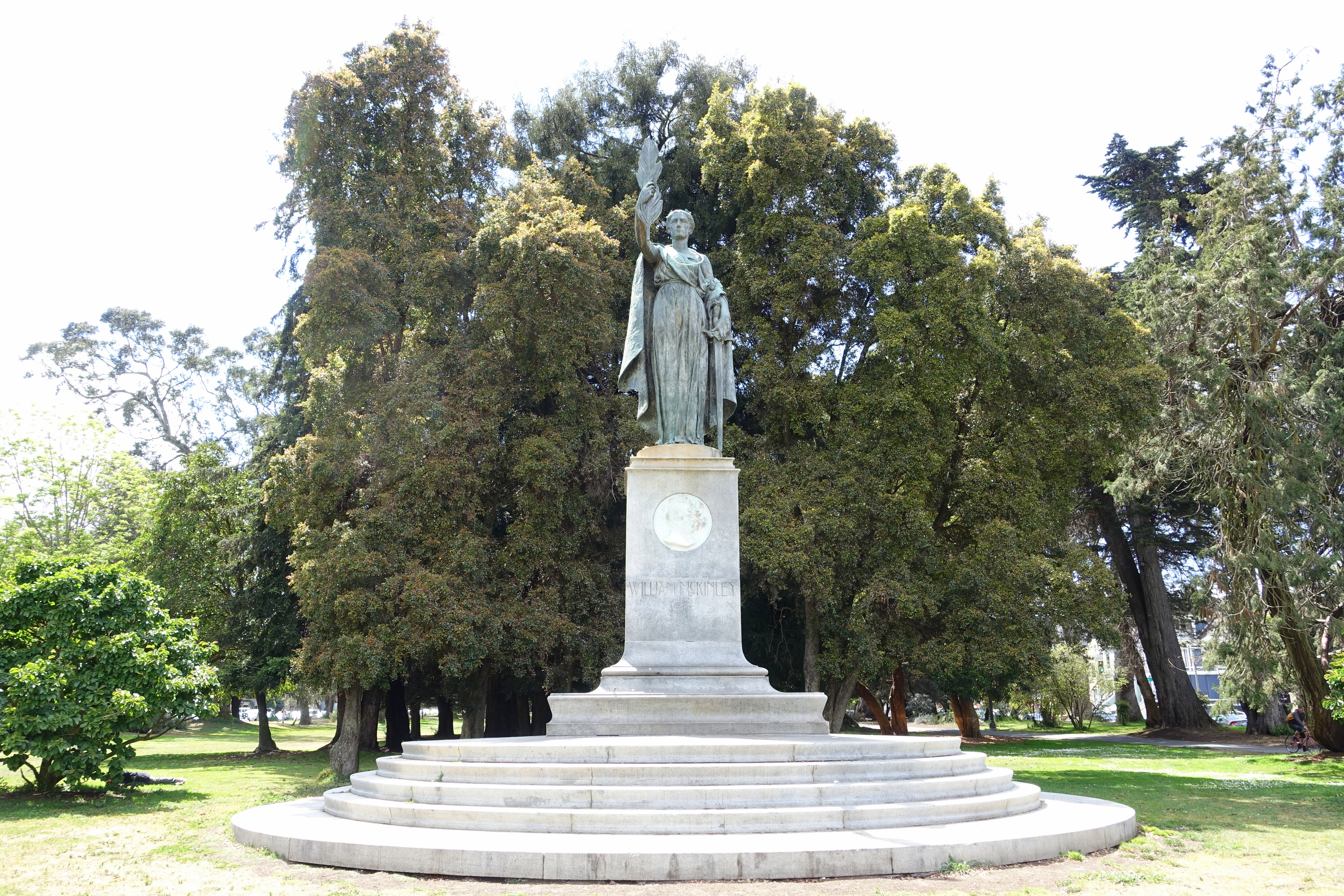
- The McKinley Monument at Golden Gate Park, San Francisco, California
- Interactive map of William McKinley Memorial
- Location: Panhandle Park, San Francisco, California, United States
- Coordinates: 37°46′23″N 122°26′28″W
- Designer: Robert Ingersoll Aitken
- Material: bronze (Sculpture); granite (Base)
- Length: 15 ft. (Sculpture); 12 ft. (Base)
- Width: 30 in. (Sculpture); 30 in. (Base)
- Height: 60 in. (Sculpture); 60 in. (Base)
- Completion date: 1904
- Dedicated to: William McKinley
- Website: Golden Gate Park

The William McKinley Memorial is a statue honoring the assassinated United States president William McKinley. It stands at the foot of Panhandle Park in San Francisco, California, and faces the DMV across Baker Street. Created by Robert Ingersoll Aitken (1878–1949) in 1904, the monument was dedicated in 1903 by President Theodore Roosevelt, who succeeded McKinley after his assassination in 1901. The monument was unveiled on November 24, 1904, at the entrance to the Golden Gate Park panhandle. Over 5,000 people came to the unveiling. Speeches were made by former mayor James D. Phelan, Mayor Eugene Schmitz, John McNaught, and others.

== History ==
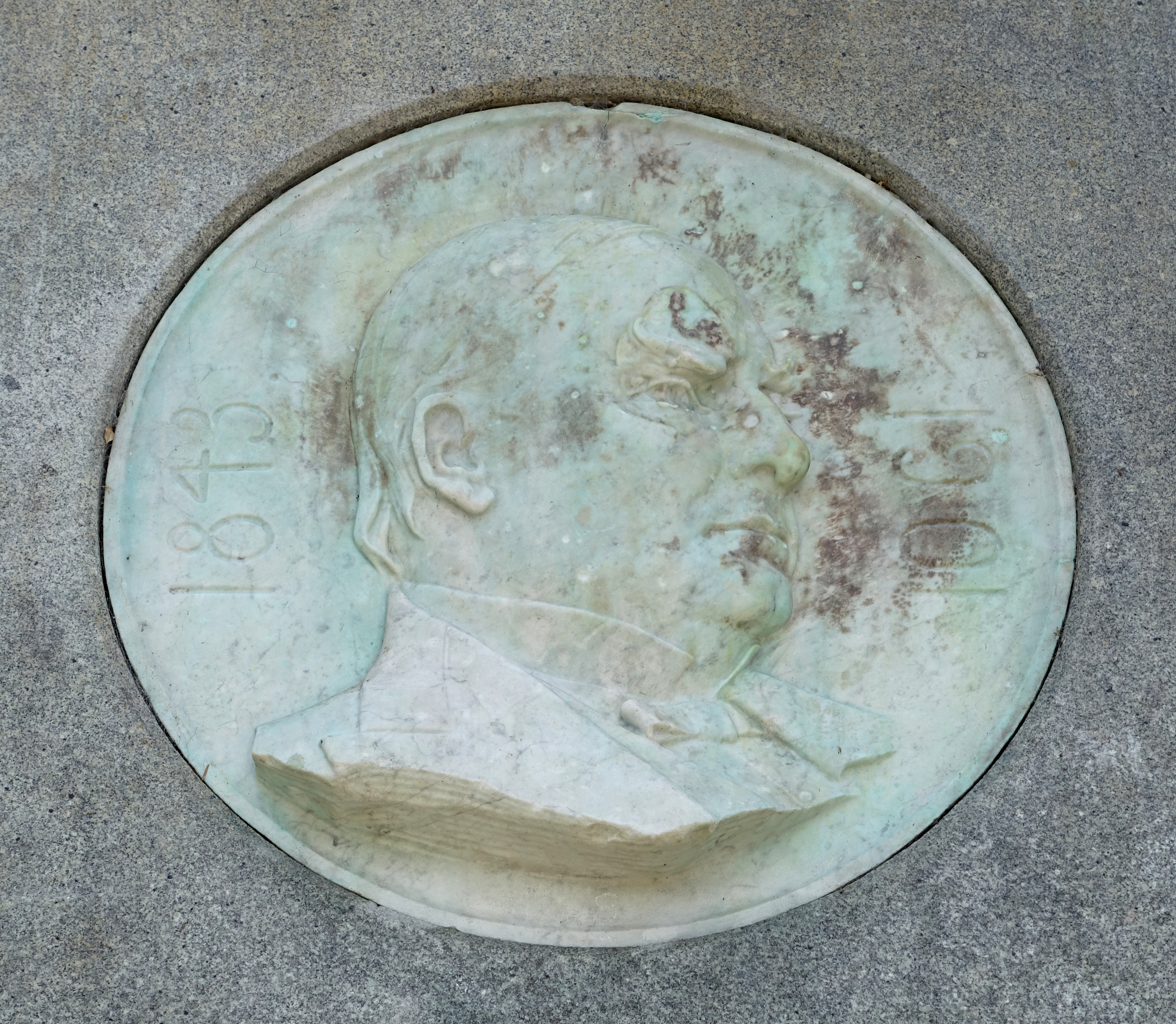
Relief bust of William McKinley shown in profile.

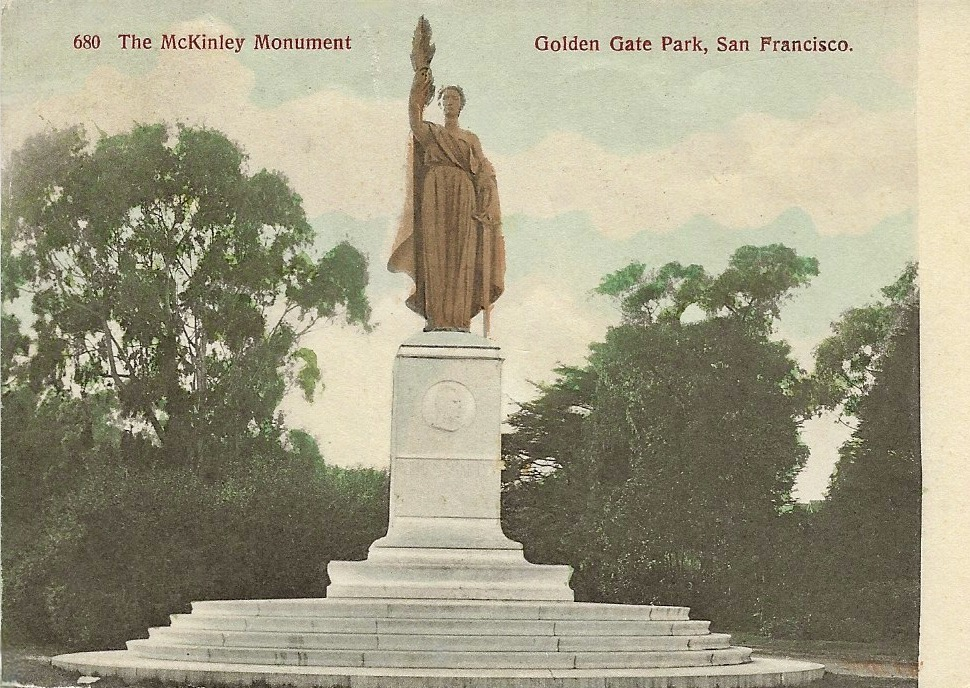
1908 Post Card of the McKinley Monument in Golden Gate Park, San Francisco.

On May 13, 1903, President Theodore Roosevelt visited San Francisco to break ground at the Golden Gate Park for the erection of a monument to the late President William McKinley. Five thousand people came to Golden Gate Park to see the president take a golden spade, dig into the ground and bring up a spadeful of earth. He was greeted by former mayor James D. Phelan, who was president of the McKinley Memorial Fund. The monument was erected at a cost of $40,000.

Robert Ingersoll Aitken, of San Francisco, was hired to sculpt a 15-foot (4.6 m) statue of a female figure, representing the Republic, that stands dressed in a tunic and cape with a laurel wreath around her head. She holds a palm leaf in her raised right hand while her left hand grasps the shaft of a sword. The statue is placed on a base that is decorated with a bust of William McKinley shown in profile. The statue and base are on a circular four-stepped platform. The inscription on the front of the base is incised with the letters: WILLIAM MCKINLEY. On one side of the base is: GROUND FOR THIS MONUMENT WAS BROKEN BY PRES ROOSEVELT MAY 13, 1903. On the other side of the base: THIS MONUMENT WAS ERECTED BY THE PEOPLE OF SAN FRANCISCO A.D. 1904.

On November 24, 1904, the monument was unveiled, at the entrance to the Golden Gate Park Panhandle, to the memory of William McKinley. Speeches were made by former Mayor James D. Phelan, Mayor Eugene Schmitz, John McNaught, and others. Over 5,000 people came to the unveiling. Robert I. Aitken was unable to attend as he was in Europe. The monument ranks among the best of his work.

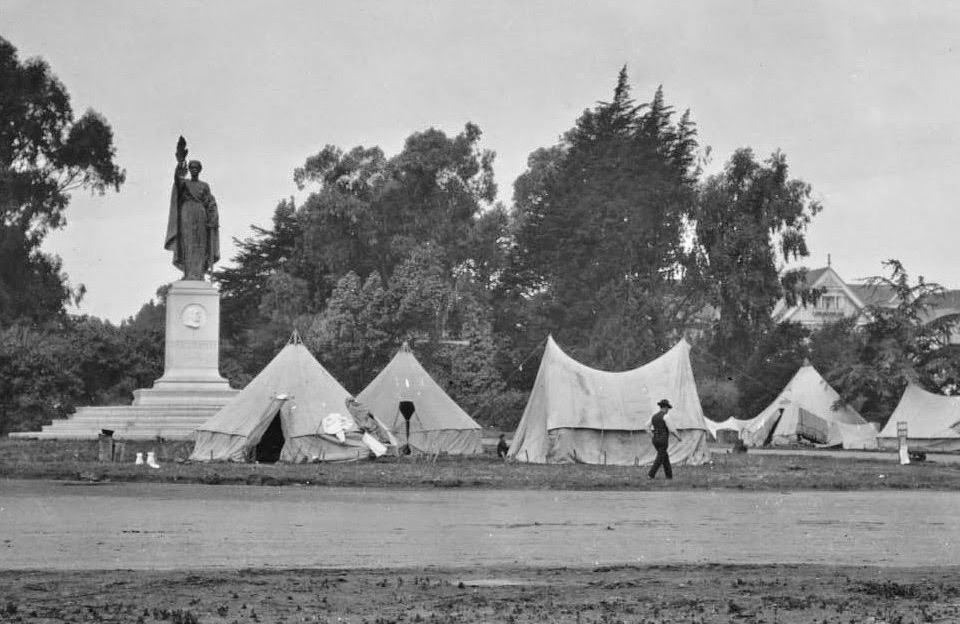
Refuges set up camp at base of the McKinley Monument (1906).

During the 1906 San Francisco earthquake, refugees sought safety by setting up camp at the base of the McKinley Memorial.

The McKinley Memorial has been the target of graffiti artists for the past several years. The San Francisco Arts Commission has tried to stop this and is working with the North of Panhandle Neighborhood Association (NOPNA) and the Haight Ashbury Neighborhood Council (HANC) to come up with solutions. One plan was to put up a $65,000 fence to keep the taggers out.

== See also ==
- Robert Ingersoll Aitken
- Panhandle (San Francisco)
