= The Wiggle =

Bicycle route in San Francisco

Coordinates: 37.77164°N 122.43357°W

The path of The Wiggle

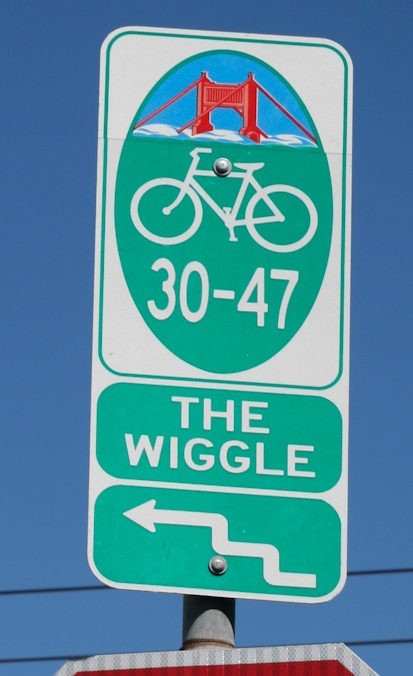
The Wiggle's city-installed route sign on Haight Street.

The Wiggle is a 1-mile (1.6 km) zig-zagging bicycle route from Market Street to Golden Gate Park in San Francisco, California, that minimizes hilly inclines for bicycle riders. Rising 120 feet (37 m), The Wiggle inclines average 3% and never exceed 6%. The path generally follows the historical route of the long since paved-over Sans Souci Valley watercourse, winding through the Lower Haight neighborhood toward the Panhandle section of Golden Gate Park.

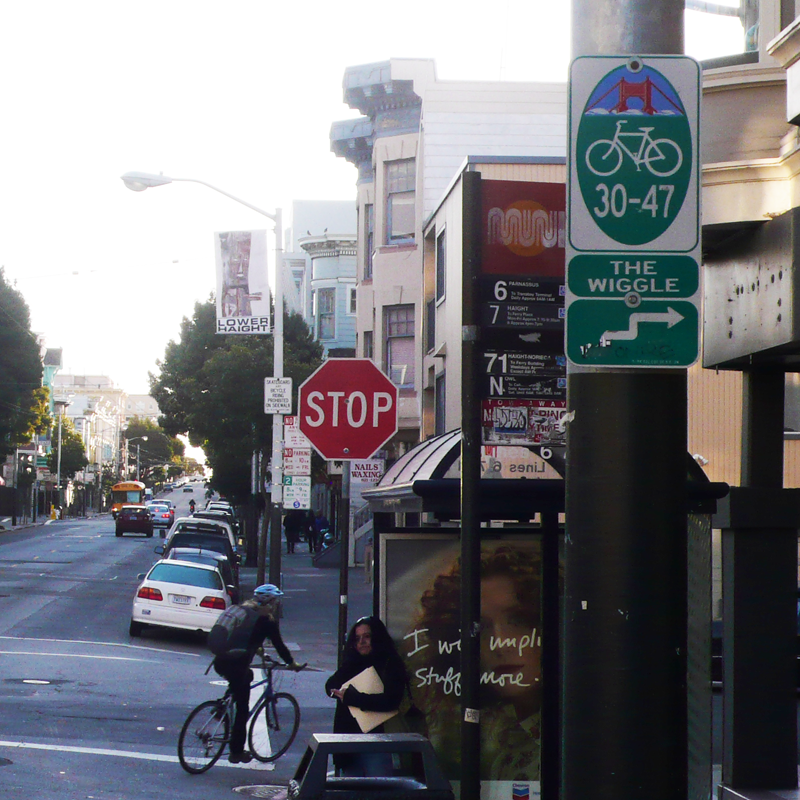
City route signs are posted visible to riders heading up or downhill. One downhill rider, pictured, is turning south on Pierce Street from the eastbound direction of Haight Street.

The lower end of the route begins at either end of the Duboce Bikeway in the block of Duboce Avenue just west of Market Street. The elevation is approximately 100 feet (30 m) above sea level. It then moves in a zig-zag toward the northwest along Duboce Avenue, Steiner, Waller, Pierce, Haight, Scott, and Fell Streets to the Panhandle Bikeway, 215 feet (66 m) above sea level. After climbing 50 more feet, the peak of The Wiggle is reached near Stanyan Street at the peninsular drainage divide, i.e., the dividing point between surface water flowing to the San Francisco Bay on the east side and flowing to the Pacific Ocean on the west.

Bicyclists can travel The Wiggle between major eastern and central neighborhoods (such as Downtown, SoMa, The Mission District, The Castro) and major western neighborhoods (including the Panhandle, Haight-Ashbury, Golden Gate Park, and The Richmond and Sunset Districts).

== History ==
Mint Hill and the hill of Alamo Square on the northeast side are made of underlying serpentine rock, whereas Lone Mountain, Corona Heights, and Buena Vista Hill on the southwest are of the Franciscan chert formation. These hills are the northernmost manifestation of the San Miguel Hills (including Twin Peaks), which themselves comprise the northern tip of the Santa Cruz Mountains.

Over thousands of years, the gentle valley bottom was formed through a process of gradual erosion of the soft, crumbly serpentine. This flat creek bed contained, until roads and other construction obliterated them, the intermittent stream of the creek itself and two ponds. As with all such flat valleys, the location of ponds tended to shift, but they were generally located at what is now Divisadero Street near Oak Street and at Market Street from Belcher Street to Reservoir Street.

=== Human history ===
Before Europeans settled in San Francisco, a route approximately following what is now known as "The Wiggle" was used as a way to avoid hills while walking. An Indian village called Chutchui existed in the vicinity of Mission Dolores near the area where The Wiggle meets Market Street. The footpath went toward what is now the Panhandle and then connected to the associated village Petlenuc at the northern tip of the San Francisco Peninsula near the current site of Crissy Field.

When the San Francisco Presidio and the Mission Dolores were founded in 1776, the trail became a horseback connector eventually called "the Old Spanish Trail." In the 19th century, the trail was the commute route of military personnel who lived in the Mission District and worked at the Presidio. In the 1860s, it finally was widened to become a toll road, passable by carriages, and going by the name "Divisadero" or "Devisadero" Street. In the 1870s, a grid of streets was imposed in its place, one retaining the old road's name, across a newly formed neighborhood with all the sandy hills and steep gullies filled or scraped flat.

In 2012, construction began on the Fell and Oak Street Bikeways, which dramatically improved the safety of the route. Fell Street previously had a narrow bicycle lane wedged between parked cars and fast-moving vehicular traffic, while high speed Oak Street had no bicycle facilities at all. The Bikeways connect the calm residential streets of the Lower Haight at Scott Street, to the protected bike path in the Panhandle at Baker Street, by replacing three blocks of parked cars with three blocks of cycle tracks. The project showcased the city government's commitment to safer pedestrian and bicycle travel (Vision Zero), and also demonstrated the political power of the San Francisco Bicycle Coalition, which had lobbied for it for many years.

== The route ==
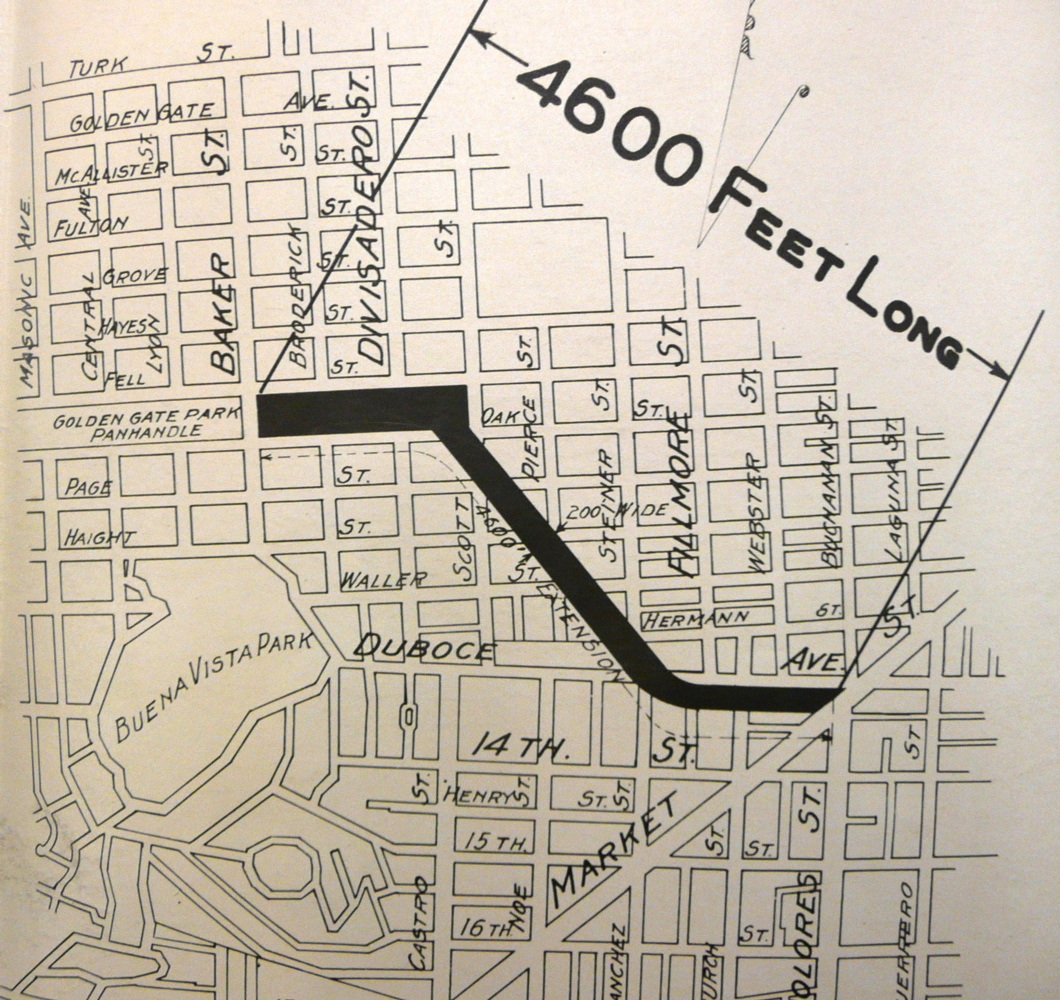
A 1928 San Francisco Public works proposal to extend the Panhandle Park to Market Street followed the Wiggle route exactly, but without the wiggling. The plan called for demolition of houses to allow a straight route.

The Wiggle follows Duboce Avenue westbound, Steiner Street northbound, Waller Street westbound, Pierce Street northbound, Haight Street westbound, Scott Street northbound, and Fell Street westbound. The route makes a turn toward the north or west each time continuing along the forward direction would present a steeper course than turning. Thus, starting at Market Street, this path avoids all steep areas and creates a route to the bike path in the Panhandle of Golden Gate Park, leading to the main routes through the Park itself. Similar "wiggles" can be found using this method for reading the geography in other hill areas.

=== Signage ===
San Francisco Bike Route 30 follows The Wiggle, with signs from Duboce Avenue westbound (at Market Street or Church Street). In some places, the signs also read "The Wiggle." In 2011, sharrows were painted on top of green pavement marking the route, making navigation easier for cyclists and alerting drivers to the presence of cyclists.

== Protests and activism ==
In 2015, the Wiggle was the site of a "stop-in" protest in response to a police crackdown on bicycles rolling stop signs. Hundreds of cyclists maliciously complied with the law by taking turns coming to complete, foot-down stops at every stop sign along the Wiggle, which severely backed up traffic. Protesters called for San Francisco to legalize the practice of bicycles treating stop signs as yield signs. A protest organizer, Morgan Fitzgibbons, said, "The thing you say you want — every cyclist to stop at every stop sign — you really don't want that." The "stop-in" protest, along with 100 cyclist comments at a public meeting, brought a halt to the police crackdown at the time, but was unsuccessful in permanently changing city policy after a proposed City ordinance by Supervisor John Avalos to legalize bicyclists treating stop signs as yield signs was vetoed by Mayor Ed Lee.

Twice a year, the Steiner Street segment of The Wiggle closes to cars for Wiggle Fest, a four hour neighborhood street fair that doubles as a demonstration of what The Wiggle could be if cars were excluded. In April 2024, shortly after a Wiggle Fest, street activist group Safe Street Rebel installed official-looking signs saying "The Wiggle / Yield to Peds & Bikes" on two blocks of Steiner Street. Two days later the signs were removed by the city. In April 2025, planters, bicycle racks, and striping, added near a crosswalk by neighbors and advocates to promote safe pedestrian crossing, were again quickly removed.
