= Victor Duboce =

Victor Donglain Duboce (September 6, 1856 – August 15, 1900) served as a lieutenant colonel of the First California Volunteer Infantry regiment in the Philippines during the Spanish–American War. He remained in the Philippines for the opening months of the Philippine–American War, during which he was promoted to colonel. Upon his return to San Francisco he was hailed as a war hero and elected to the Board of Supervisors. He is the namesake of Duboce Avenue, Duboce Park, and the surrounding neighborhood in San Francisco.
