= BlackMan's Art Gallery =

Art gallery in San Francisco, California, US (1967–1974)

- Formation: September 30, 1967
- Founder: William O. Thomas Jr. Robin R. Thomas
- Dissolved: 1974
- Headquarters: 619 Haight Street, Lower Haight, San Francisco, California
- Location: United States
- Coordinates: 37.771725°N 122.432474°W

BlackMan's Art Gallery (1967 – 1974) in the Lower Haight neighborhood of San Francisco, California, was a commercial art gallery highlighting African American artists and artwork featuring images of African Americans. It was founded during the Black Arts Movement.

== History ==
BlackMan's Art Gallery was initially located at 619 Haight Street, and in 1971 it moved to 325 Haight Street. The BlackMan's Art Gallery was founded by married couple William O. Thomas Jr. (also known as Juba Solo) and Robin R. Thomas. Thomas Jr. was an artist himself that struggled with gallery representation, so he opened his own gallery space and recruited many of his friends to show their work.

Artists that were exhibited at BlackMan's Art Gallery included Richard Allen, Saadat Ahmad, Francis Anastasis, John Benson, Charles Bible, Courtney Bowie, John Britton, Fred Brown, Montford Cardwell, Bernard Catchings, Dewey Crumpler, O.L. Daniels, Joseph Geran, Monjett Graham, Robert Henry Graham, Kwasi Jayourba, Marie Johnson, Leon Kennedy, Nat Knighton, E. E. Mays, Aum (Don Patton), Melvin Pierre, William Maysfield, William Morris Jr., Ben Mundine, Roho, Richard Sharp, Damballah Dolphus Smith Jr., Michael S. Thomas, Royce Vaughn, and Deborah Wilkins.

For a brief period in the 1960s and 1970s in the United States, there was a period of major art galleries run by and for Black artists. Other notable Black-owned art galleries during this era include Brockman Gallery (1967–1990) of Los Angeles, Gallery 32 (1968–1970) of Los Angeles, and Just Above Midtown (known as JAM Gallery; 1973–1989) of New York City.
