= William A. Starke Memorial =

Statue by Robert Ingersoll Aitken

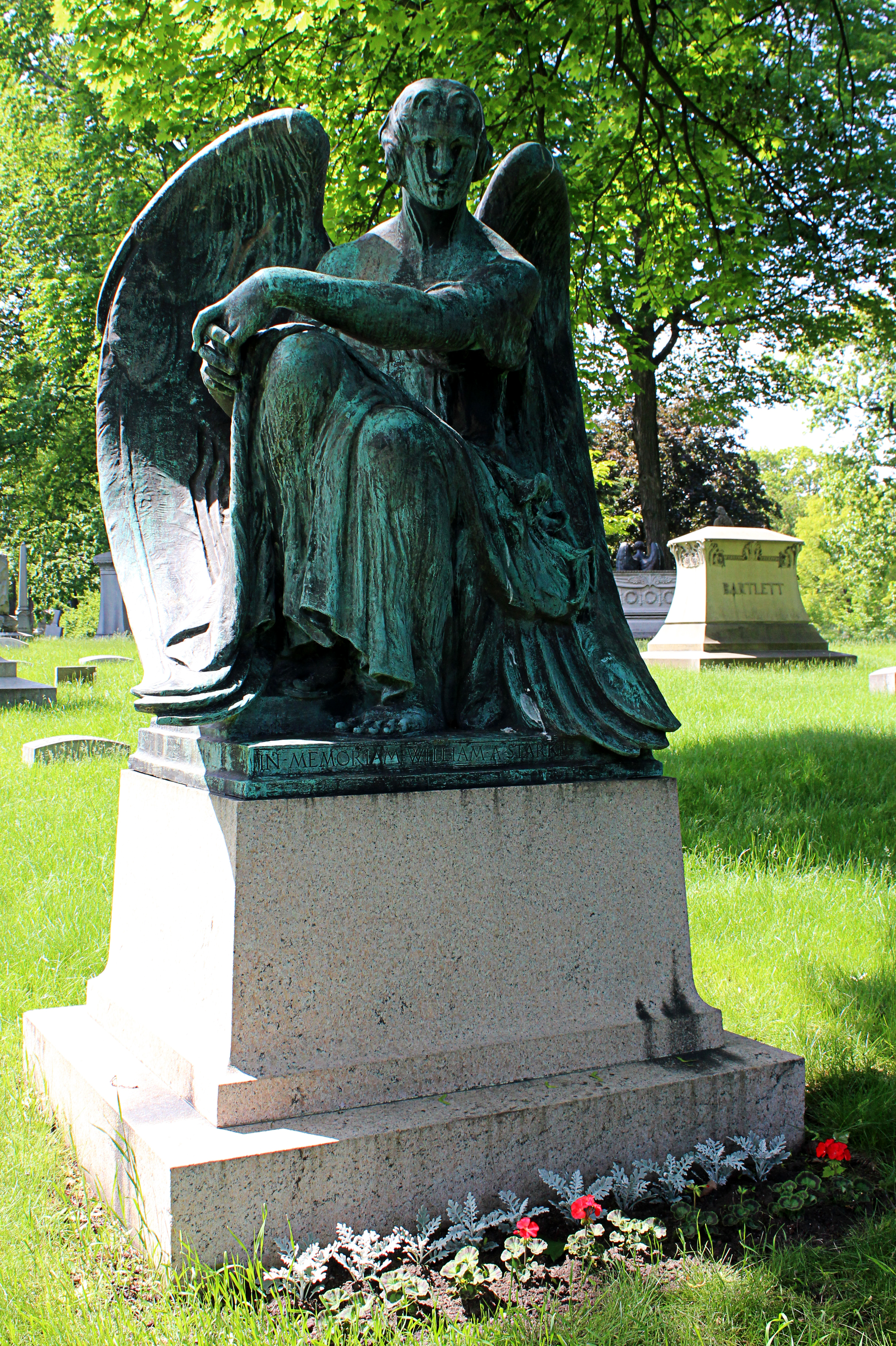
- Artist: Robert Ingersoll Aitken
- Year: 1921
- Type: bronze
- Dimensions: 180 cm × 160 cm (69 in × 62 in)
- Location: Milwaukee, Wisconsin; 42.996736°N 87.942286°W
- Owner: Forest Home Cemetery

William A. Starke Memorial is a public art work by American artist Robert Ingersoll Aitken, located in the Forest Home Cemetery on the south side of Milwaukee, Wisconsin. The artwork is a bronze figure depicting a seated angel. It is located in Section 33 of the cemetery at 2405 W. Forest Home Ave.

The work commemorates William Starke, a local business man involved with the C.H. Starke Bridge Company, the Christopher Steamship Company, and the Sheriff Manufacturing Company.
