= Lone Mountain College =

Jesuit college in San Francisco, California (1898–1978)

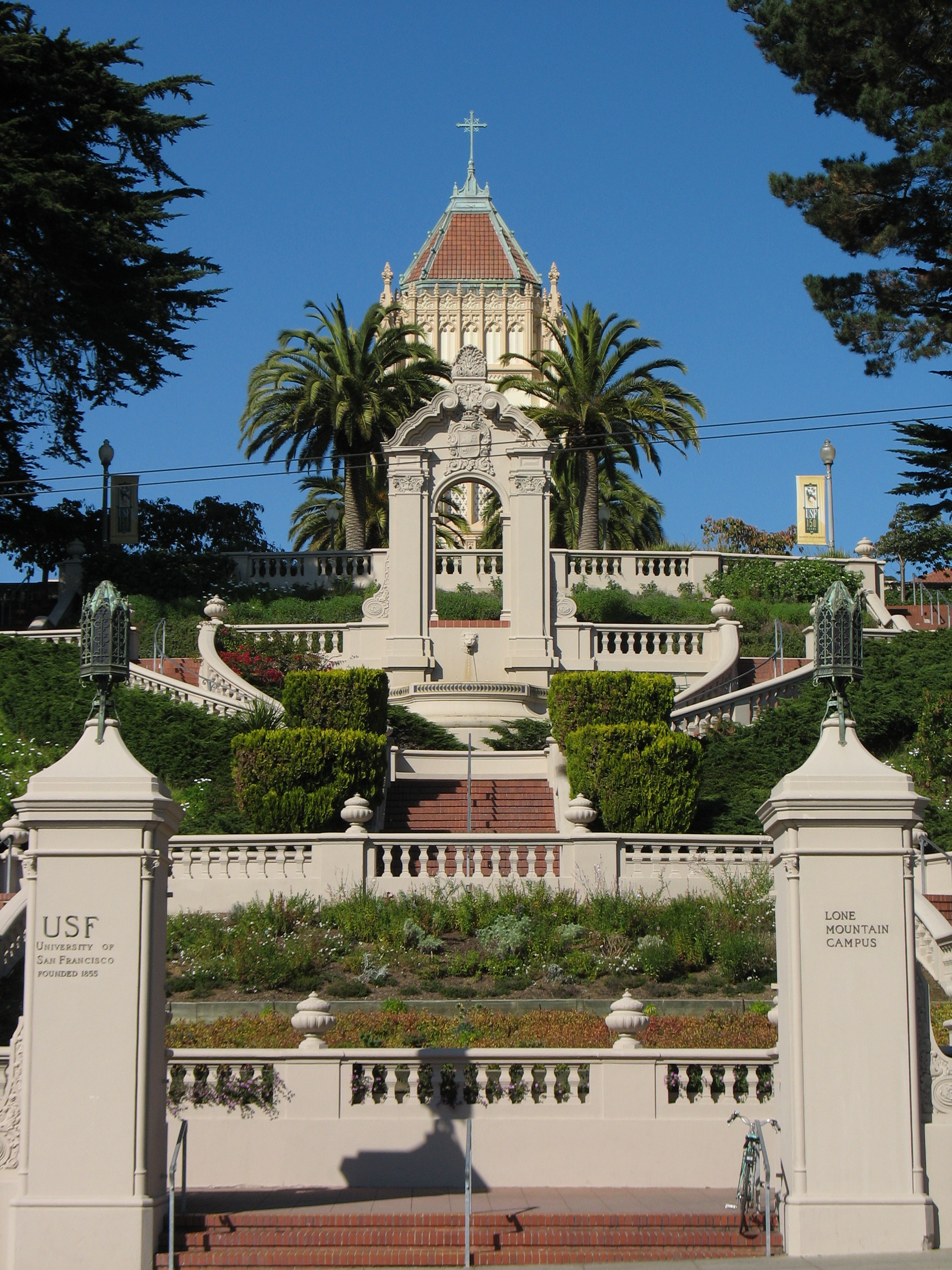
Former San Francisco College for Women and Lone Mountain College and present day University of San Francisco Lone Mountain Campus

Lone Mountain College was a private Catholic college acquired by the Jesuit run University of San Francisco (USF) in 1978.

== History ==
It was built and founded by the Religious of the Sacred Heart as Sacred Heart Academy in Menlo Park, California, in 1898. The school became College of the Sacred Heart in 1921. In the 1930s, it moved to San Francisco, California, and became San Francisco College for Women. It was located near the Lone Mountain Cemetery, which was in the process of removal. The school then changed its name again to Lone Mountain College, in 1969, at which time the College began admitting men and became co-educational.

In 1978, the college was acquired by the University of San Francisco to become USF's Lone Mountain Campus.
