= Duboce Park =

Public park in San Francisco, California, USA

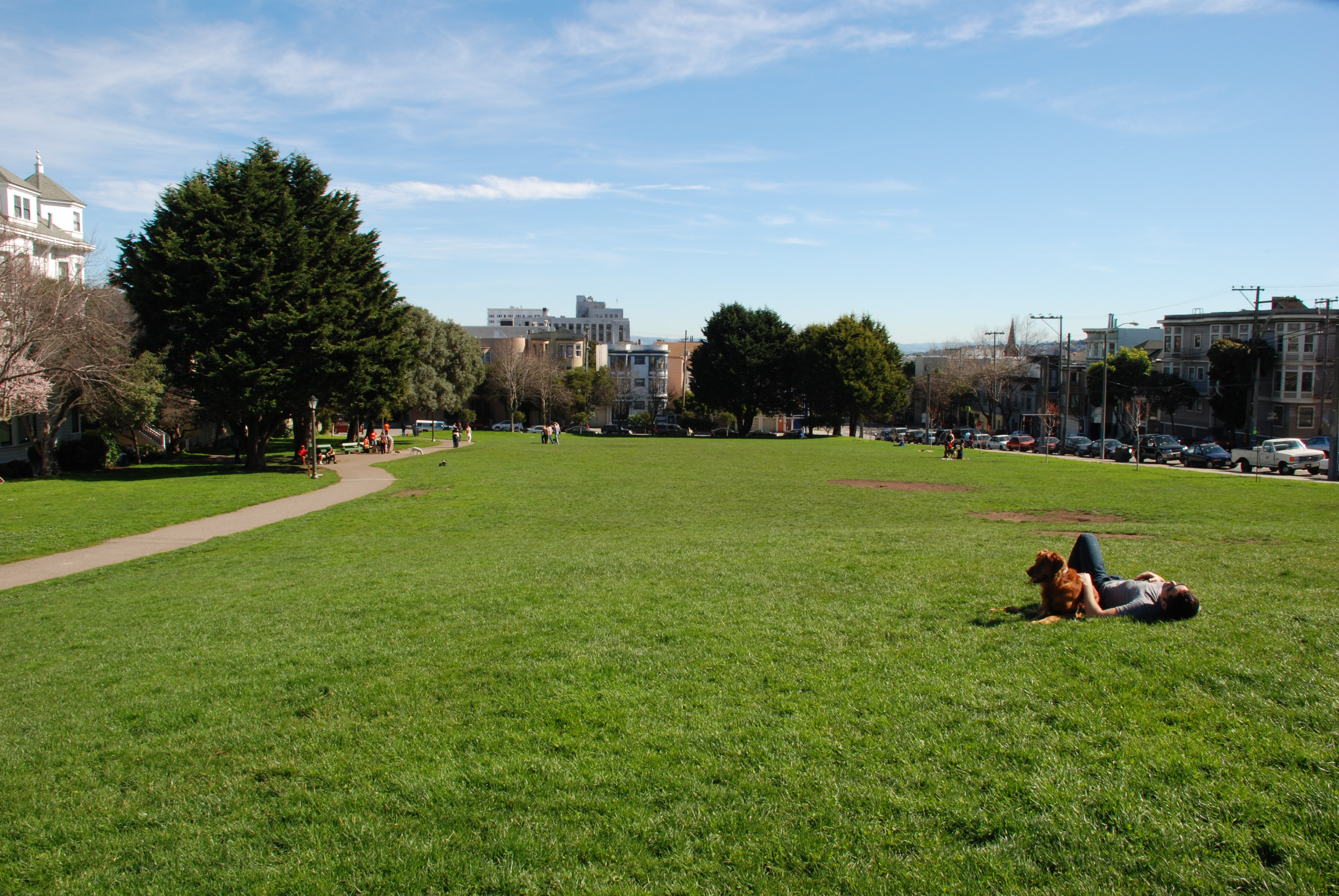
- View of Duboce Park, facing east.
- Interactive map of Duboce Park
- Type: Urban park
- Location: San Francisco, California
- Coordinates: 37.7696°N 122.4332°W
- Established: 1858; 168 years ago
- Operated by: San Francisco Recreation & Parks Department

Duboce Park (IPA: /du.'bos/) is a small urban park located between the Duboce Triangle and Lower Haight neighborhoods of San Francisco, California. The park is less than one block wide from north to south and two blocks wide from west to east. Its western boundary is Scott Street, and its eastern boundary is Steiner Street. The park is part of the Duboce Park Landmark District.

The N Judah Muni Metro streetcar line runs along Duboce Avenue, which forms the southern boundary of the park. As such, the park is served directly by the Duboce and Noe Street MUNI station. The train tracks veer away from Duboce Avenue at the western end of the park and enter the Sunset Tunnel.

== Location and overview ==
=== Off leash area ===
Duboce Park is a popular site for dog walkers, and off-leash dog play is permitted in the Multi-Use Area (the southeastern section of the park), which officially opened for use on March 8, 2008. West of the Multi-Use area is a fence-enclosed area with a children's play structure. Behind the play area (to the west) is a fenced-in basketball court with multiple rims. Across from the children's play area is a half-moon shaped area designated a Public Lawn Area and intended for use by people only (dogs are not allowed in this area.) In between the Public Lawn Area and the Multi-Use Area is a walking path equipped with water fountains designed, respectively, for human and animal use. Along Scott Street is a labyrinth, completed in 2007, designed for meditation, contemplation, or relaxation.

=== Recreational Arts Building ===
Along the west end of the park (along Scott Street) is the Harvey Milk Recreational Arts Building, which underwent expansion/renovation and reopened in June 2009. The facility hosts a number of community events and includes a photography center, a studio for dance and aerobics classes, and a Midnight Music Program. In addition, the Friends of Duboce Park host an Annual Film Festival, featuring movies filmed in San Francisco, in the photography center.

=== Film and TV ===
A fake BART station was constructed in the park in 2005 for filming of the movie The Pursuit of Happyness; it was removed after filming. The park also features in Gus Van Sant's Oscar-winning biopic Milk. A helicopter landed in the park as part of a stunt for the television series Trauma.

=== Weather observation ===
San Francisco's official weather observation site is located in Duboce Park, which is near the geographical and populational center of the city, although data from the automated weather station at San Francisco International Airport, actually located about 10 miles to the south in San Mateo County, often appears as belonging to "San Francisco" in media sources outside the Bay Area.

=== Homes ===
The park is unusual for having homes directly alongside it. It is one of the few parks in the city without a roadway or walkway separating the park land from buildings.

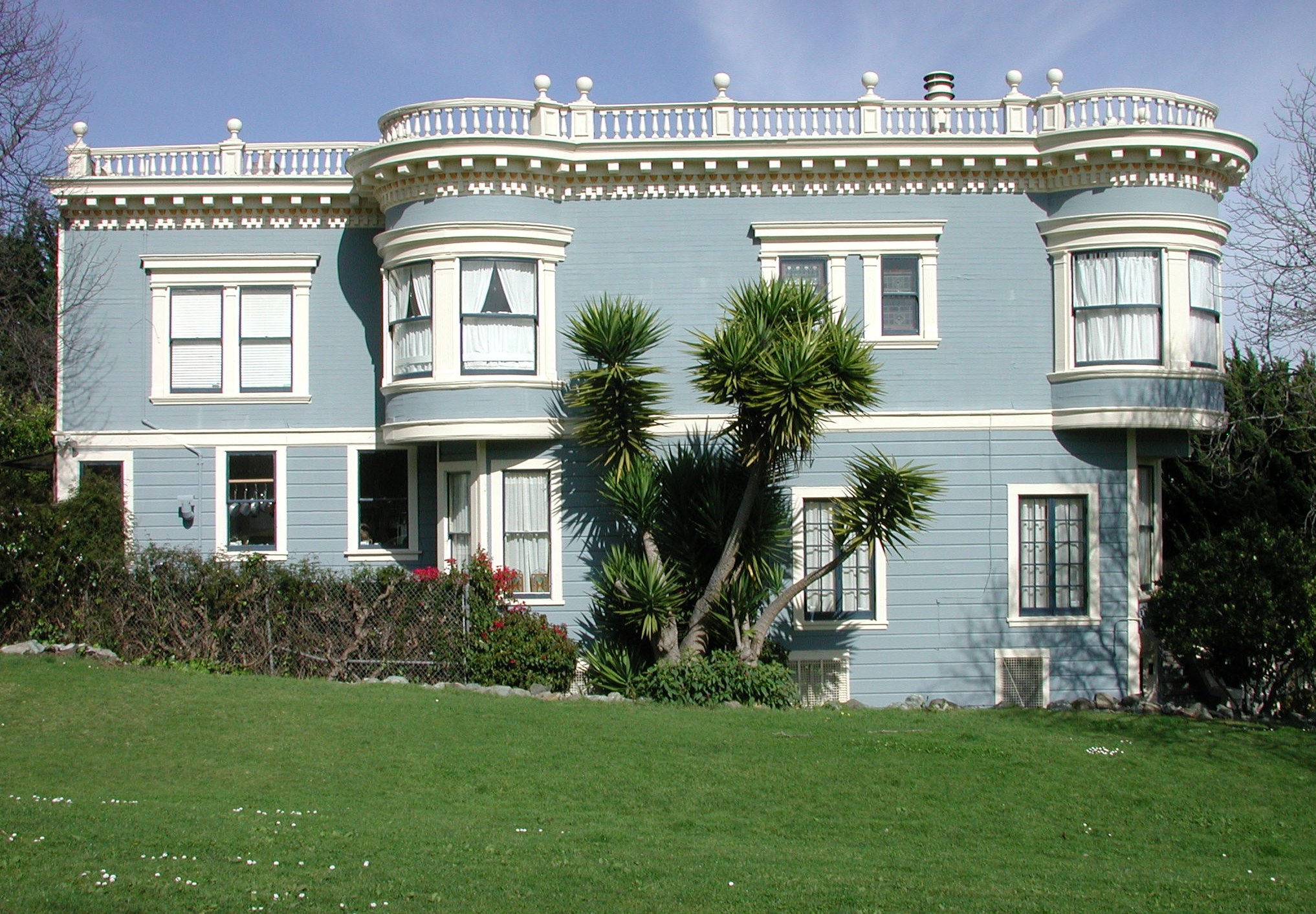
Home along Duboce Park.

== History ==
The space was designated by the city as public park land in 1858, but it was not until 1902 that the park was built. This coincided with a period of rapid development of homes in the surrounding area, now known as the Duboce Park Landmark District. The 1906 earthquake and fire devastated much of San Francisco; however, the Duboce Park area was relatively undamaged and the park was used as a refuge camp for a year for displaced citizens.

The park is named after Victor Donglain Duboce.

== Controversy ==
In the past, dog owners flouted city leash laws by letting their dogs run free throughout the park. This conflict was resolved when the official off-leash area was established. Some residents have noted that the off-leash area is far larger than the on-leash area. Because of the large number of dogs, owners are reminded to remove the droppings.
