= Panhandle (San Francisco) =

Linear park in California, US

Coordinates: 37.772°N 122.450°W

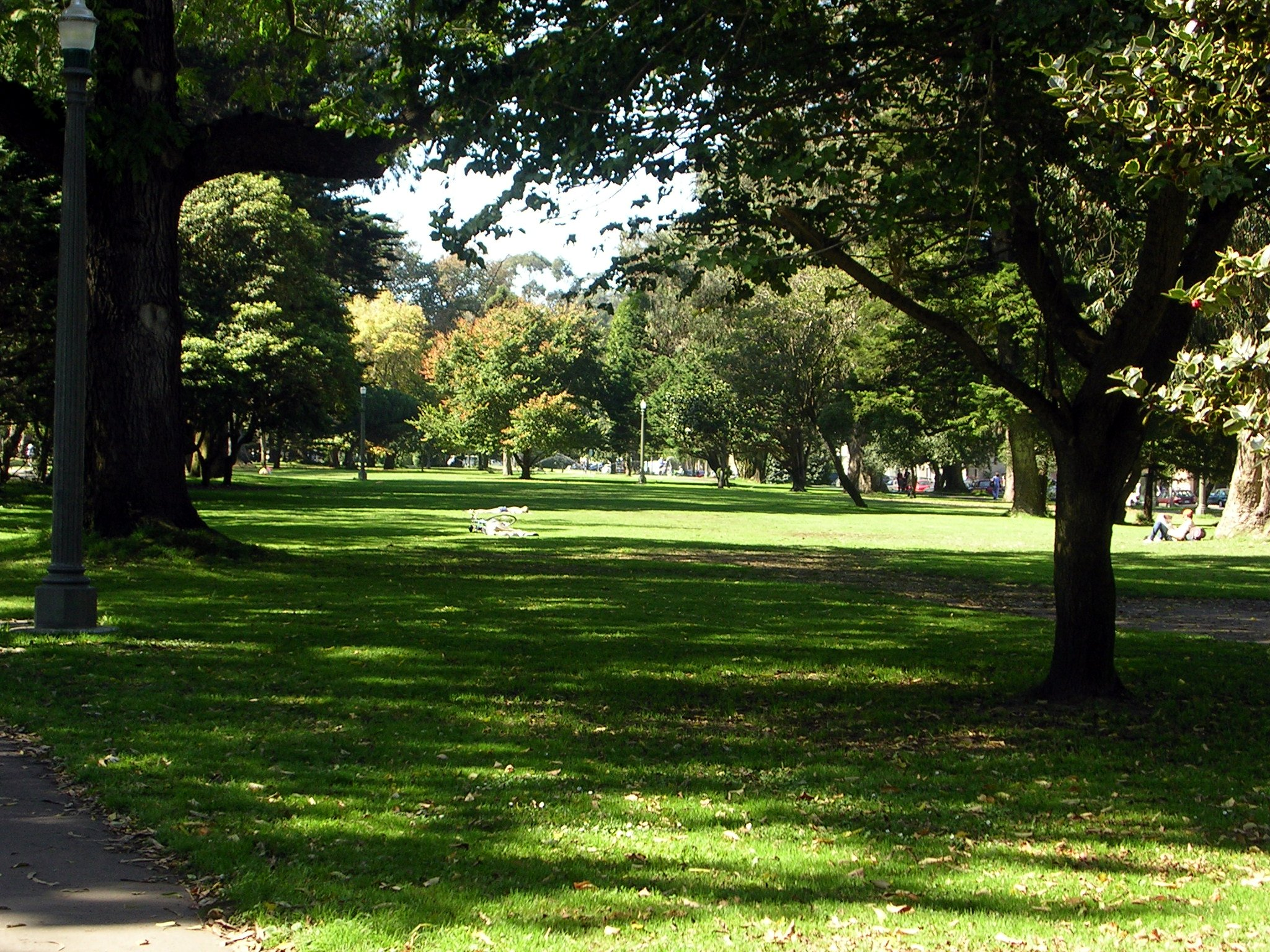
- The Panhandle from Clayton Street
- Interactive map of Panhandle
- Type: Municipal (San Francisco)
- Location: San Francisco
- Created: 1870
- Status: Open all year
- Parking: Street parking

The Panhandle is a public park in San Francisco, California, so named because it forms a panhandle with Golden Gate Park. It is long and narrow, being three-quarters of a mile (eight blocks) long and just one block wide. Fell and Oak Streets border it to the north and south, Baker Street to the east, and to the west Stanyan Street which separates the smaller Panhandle from the much larger Golden Gate Park. The Panhandle is bisected by Masonic Avenue, which runs north to south and cuts through the middle of the park. In its westernmost block, Oak and Fell Streets angle across the Panhandle, converge with one another, and continue west of Stanyan as John F. Kennedy Drive and Kezar Drive.

Two paved walking paths, one allowing bicycles, run the entire length of the Panhandle from east to west, and several shorter ones criss-cross it north to south. In its western section, between Stanyan and Masonic, the Panhandle contains basketball courts, a public restroom, a playground, and an outdoor gym. The William McKinley Memorial is at the eastern end of the Panhandle, just across Baker Street from the DMV; it consists of a statue and seating area, and was dedicated in 1904 by President Theodore Roosevelt, who succeeded McKinley after his assassination in 1901.

The Panhandle forms the southern boundary of the Western Addition neighborhood and the northern boundary of the Haight-Ashbury district.

== History ==
An 1853 map of San Francisco labels the area that the Panhandle and Golden Gate Park presently occupy the "Great Sand Bank". In 1870, the Panhandle's footprint occupied large, shifting sand-dunes with little vegetation in between it and the Pacific Ocean known as the "Outside Lands". The large hills of sand, semi-arid conditions, and powerful winds generated by the Golden Gate effect conspired to make agriculture and gardening nearly impossible—except for in a few small valleys protected from the constant winds.

William Hammond Hall's long-term plan to create a vast recreational park in San Francisco was first implemented in The Panhandle in 1870, which became part of Hall's experimental laboratory for finding suitable vegetation for reclaiming the dunes. After much trial and error, Hall found that by first planting barley, followed months later by sea bent grass mixed with yellow lupin, the sand dunes could be stabilized enough to dump manure and top-soil without risk of wind erosion. On top of this layer, Monterey pines, Monterey cypresses and Eucalyptus—all known for quick growth and shallow root structures—could take root.

After Hall tamed the dunes, the Panhandle was ready to accept planting of hundreds of tree varietals, representing regions from all over the world, including such species as Bailey's Acacia, Japanese yew, black walnut, blackwood acacia, Queensland kauri, and Italian alder. The land in and around the Panhandle has been so completely transformed by over 100 years of irrigation and development that the sandy, unstable ground beneath is no longer apparent.

In 1899, a proposal was considered for an expansion of the Panhandle due eastward, across Van Ness Avenue and all the way to Market Street downtown. Another idea in 1928 proposed extending the Panhandle diagonally across the Lower Haight and Duboce Triangle neighborhoods and reaching Market Street further west. Neither of these were ever carried out.

In the 1950s, a freeway was proposed that would have run through the Panhandle, taking the place of a road running through the park known as The Avenue Drive, but due to a citizen freeway revolt it was canceled; the San Francisco Board of Supervisors voted in 1959 and again in 1966 against building the Panhandle freeway. Instead, the road through the Panhandle was removed entirely and the streets on either side of it were turned into wide, one-way streets, with traffic lights timed to allow cars to move continuously at 20 (formerly 25) miles per hour. Similar one-way pairs of rapid through-streets exist throughout San Francisco.

The popular bike and walking path along the north side of the Panhandle, along with the Fell and Oak Street Bikeways, The Wiggle, and Market Street, form an important link between the largely residential Richmond and Sunset Districts, which are west of Twin Peaks, and other areas to the east, including the Civic Center, Financial District, and Mission District. This route follows the terrain in such a way as to allow someone to traverse San Francisco without having to climb its steepest hills. The Bikeways, which feature physical barriers that separate the bike traffic from the fast-moving car traffic, were built by removing three blocks of parking from the south side of both streets (between Baker and Scott), an almost impossible political feat in car-clogged San Francisco. In addition to the bike and walking path, west-bound riders can also use a bicycles-only curb lane, which is separated from moving traffic by a parking lane, on Fell Street along the north side of the Panhandle.
