= Lower Haight, San Francisco =

Neighborhood of San Francisco, California

Lower Haight
- Neighborhood of San Francisco
- aka: Haight-Fillmore
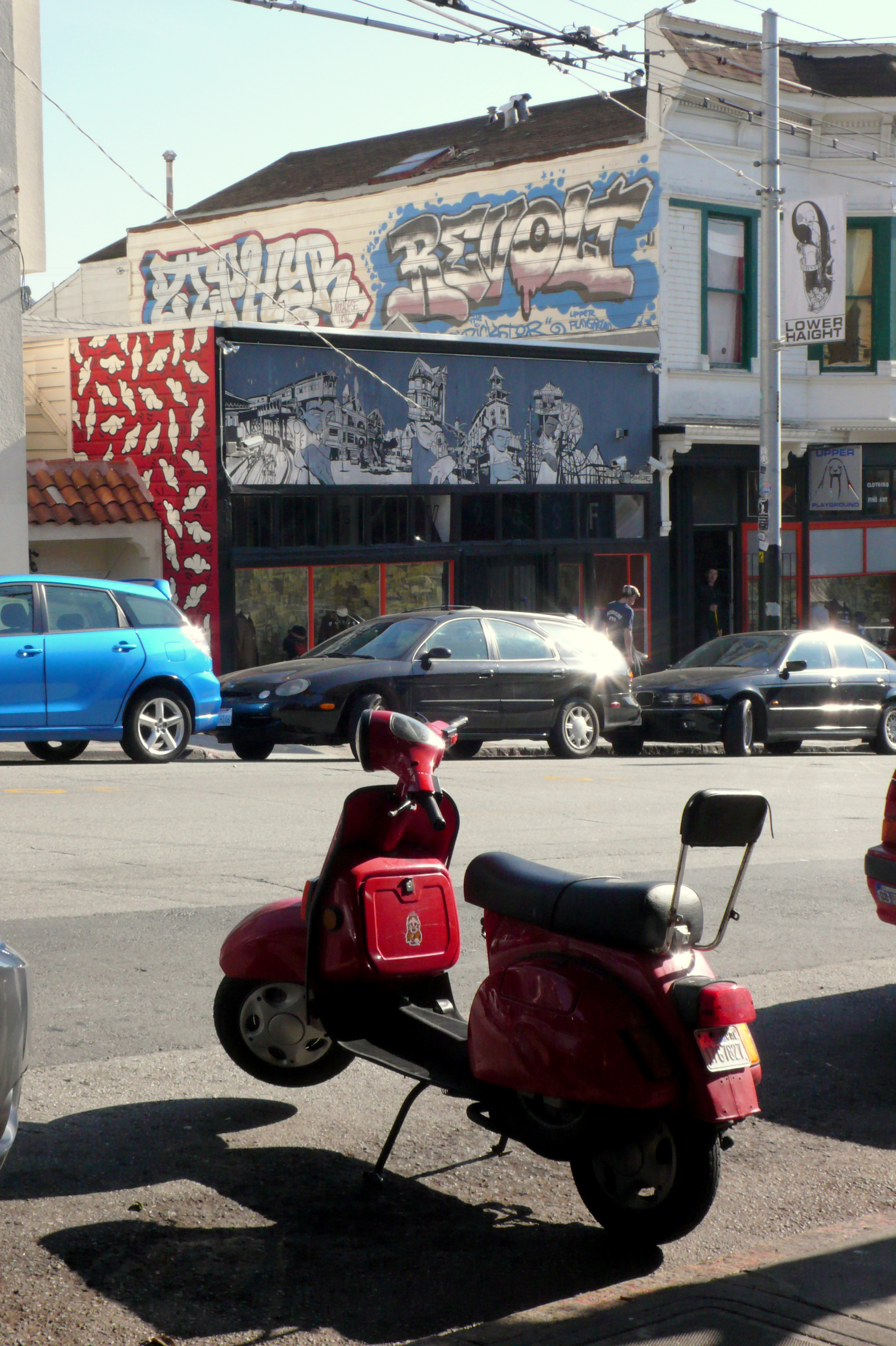
- Haight Street near Fillmore

- Location within Central San Francisco
- Coordinates: 37.7721°N 122.4305°W

Government
  - Supervisor: Bilal Mahmood
  - State Assembly: Matt Haney (D)
  - State Senator: Scott Wiener (D)
  - U. S. Rep.: Nancy Pelosi (D)

Area
  - Total: 0.77 km^{2} (0.298 sq mi)
  - Land: 0.77 km^{2} (0.298 sq mi)

Population
  - Total: 9,120
  - Density: 11,835/km^{2} (30,653/sq mi)
- ZIP Code: 94102, 94117
- Area codes: 415/628

The Lower Haight is a neighborhood, sometimes referred to as Haight–Fillmore, in San Francisco, California.

== Location ==
The Lower Haight Merchants & Neighbors Association (LoHaMNA) defines the Lower Haight as encompassing the entire stretch of Haight Street east of Divisadero Street to its eastern terminus at Market Street and extending one block north and south to include Oak and Waller Streets. The San Francisco Mayor's Office of Neighborhood Services (MONS) adopts a similar definition, but defines the area south of Haight between Webster Street and Octavia Boulevard as part of Mint Hill, and the section of the neighborhood west of Webster Street extending as far north as Fell Street. The San Francisco Association of Realtors (SFAR) treats the entire area as an extension of Hayes Valley.

Adjacent neighborhoods include the Western Addition/Fillmore District and Alamo Square to the north; Duboce Triangle to the south; Hayes Valley to the east; and the Upper Haight (better known as the Haight-Ashbury) to the west.

The terms "Lower" and "Upper" Haight may refer to the differences in elevation between the two neighborhoods or the lower and higher address numbers along these parts of Haight Street..

== Attractions and characteristics ==
A mixture of restaurants, small nightclubs, cafes, drinking establishments, residences, galleries, and hair salons characterizes the Lower Haight. Neighborhood institutions include John Muir Elementary School, the San Francisco Mint, Koshland and Duboce Parks, and the Haight Street Art Center. The San Francisco Zen Center is at the northeast edge of the neighborhood in an elegant brick building designed by famed architect Julia Morgan in 1922.

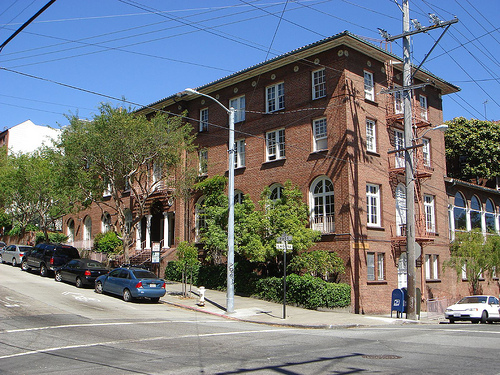
San Francisco Zen Center

Lower Haight differs from Upper Haight by having a more diverse population and a smaller number of retail businesses. The Victorian and Edwardian houses tend to be less ornately painted and maintained in the Lower Haight than in the Haight/Ashbury neighborhood, and rent can be lower. The neighborhood has been referred to as having a "grungey, post-punk bohemian" atmosphere.

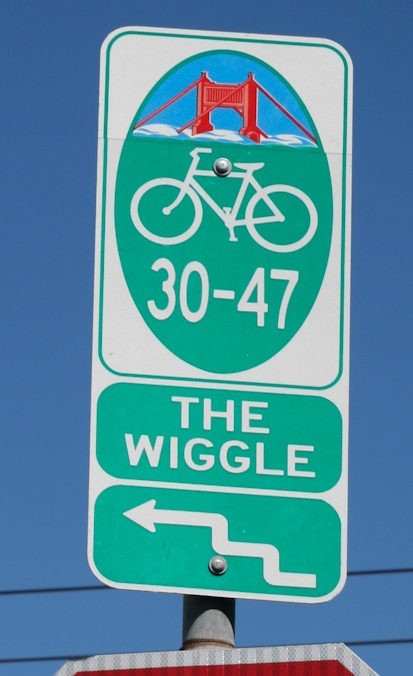
The Wiggle bicycle route through the Lower Haight

The area is served by several San Francisco Municipal Railway (MUNI) bus lines and is within a few blocks of all MUNI Metro lines. The heart of the neighborhood, at the corner of Fillmore and Haight, is six blocks from the subway stop of Church and Market, which is also the location of the city's largest supermarket, a Safeway. Surveys show that this neighborhood has one of the highest number of daily trips by bike per capita of any San Francisco neighborhood, and walking is also very popular. The geography of the Lower Haight lends itself to the most efficient bicycle routing from the Mission District towards Golden Gate Park and surrounding neighborhoods, and the popular bicycle route termed "The Wiggle" zig-zags through this neighborhood.

== See also ==
- Shut Up, Little Man!
- BlackMan's Art Gallery (1967–1974)
