= Duboce Triangle, San Francisco =

Coordinates: 37.768°N 122.433°W

Duboce Triangle
- Neighborhood
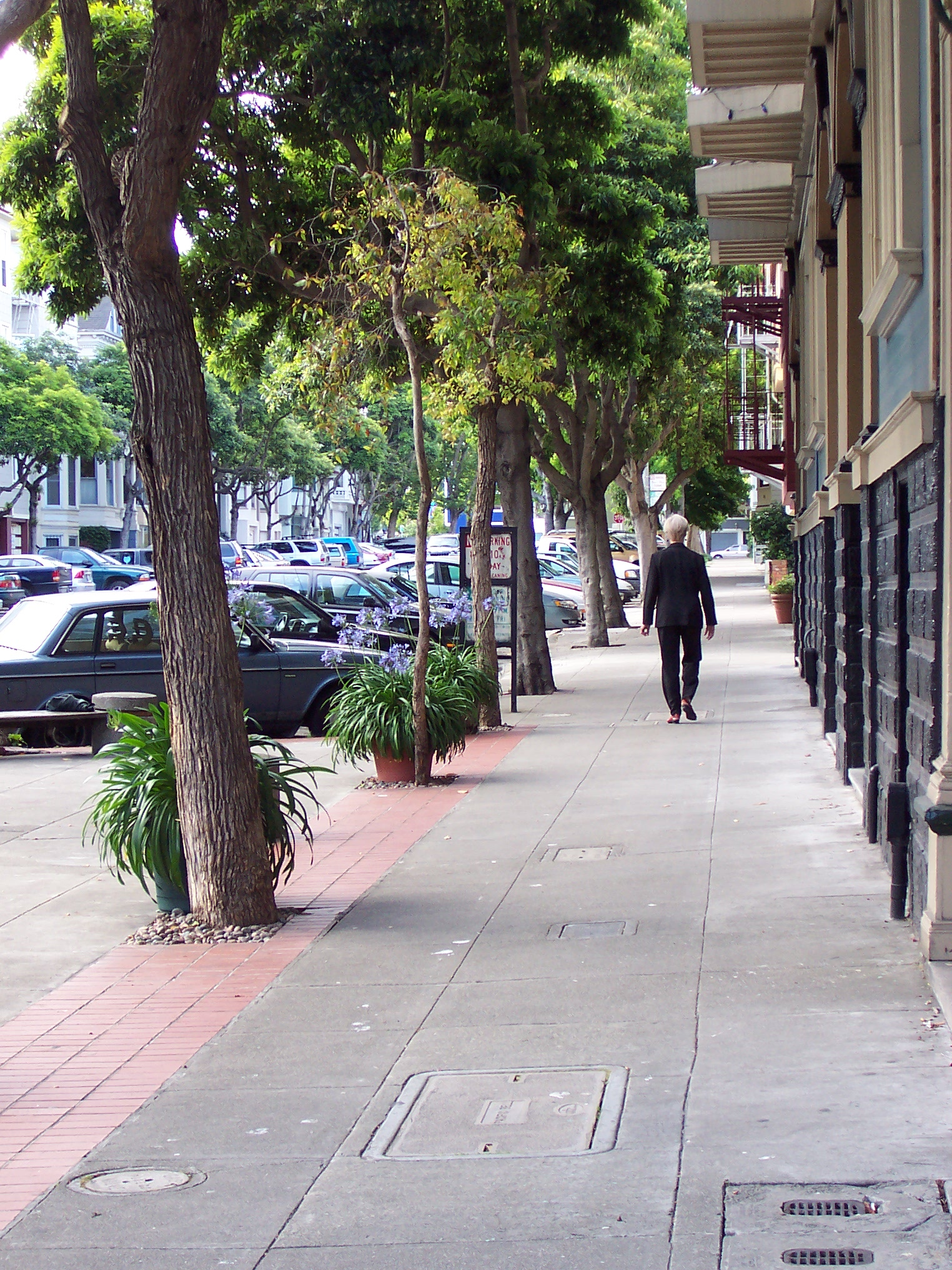
- Sanchez Street near 14th Street
- Interactive map of Duboce Triangle
- Country: United States
- State: California
- City and county: San Francisco

Area
  - Total: 0.114 sq mi (0.30 km^{2})

Population (2020)
  - Total: 3,425
  - Density: 30,092/sq mi (11,619/km^{2})
- Time zone: UTC-8 (Pacific)
  - Summer (DST): UTC-7 (PDT)
- Area codes: 415/628

The Duboce Triangle is a neighborhood of San Francisco, California, located below Buena Vista Park and between the neighborhoods of the Castro/Eureka Valley, the Mission District, and the Lower Haight.

The Duboce Triangle is served by Muni Metro and buses. Because of its location east of Buena Vista Heights and Twin Peaks, the area sees less fog than many places in San Francisco.

== Location ==
According to the 2010 neighborhoods map of the San Francisco Association of Realtors (SFAR), Duboce Triangle is bordered by Market Street on its southeastern side, by Castro Street to the West and by Duboce Avenue to the North. A 2006 definition by the city mayor's Office of Neighborhood Services puts the neighborhood's northern boundary further north at Waller Street (thereby including Duboce Park), while still excluding the San Francisco Mint building near Market Street.

== History ==
The name Duboce originates from Victor Duboce, a lieutenant colonel of the First California Volunteer Infantry regiment in the Philippines during the Spanish–American War.

Many of the houses in the neighborhood are 1906 flats in the classic revival style, with the earliest house dating from the 1870s (such as the house at 22 Beaver Street built in 1876). A Victorian apartment building at the Northern side of 400 Duboce Avenue which survived the 1906 earthquake, has been described as the country's largest wooden structure to the West of the Mississippi.

From 1970 to 1984, the neighborhood was home to Scott's Pit, the first lesbian biker bar in the city.
