= Victorian architecture =

Series of architectural revival styles

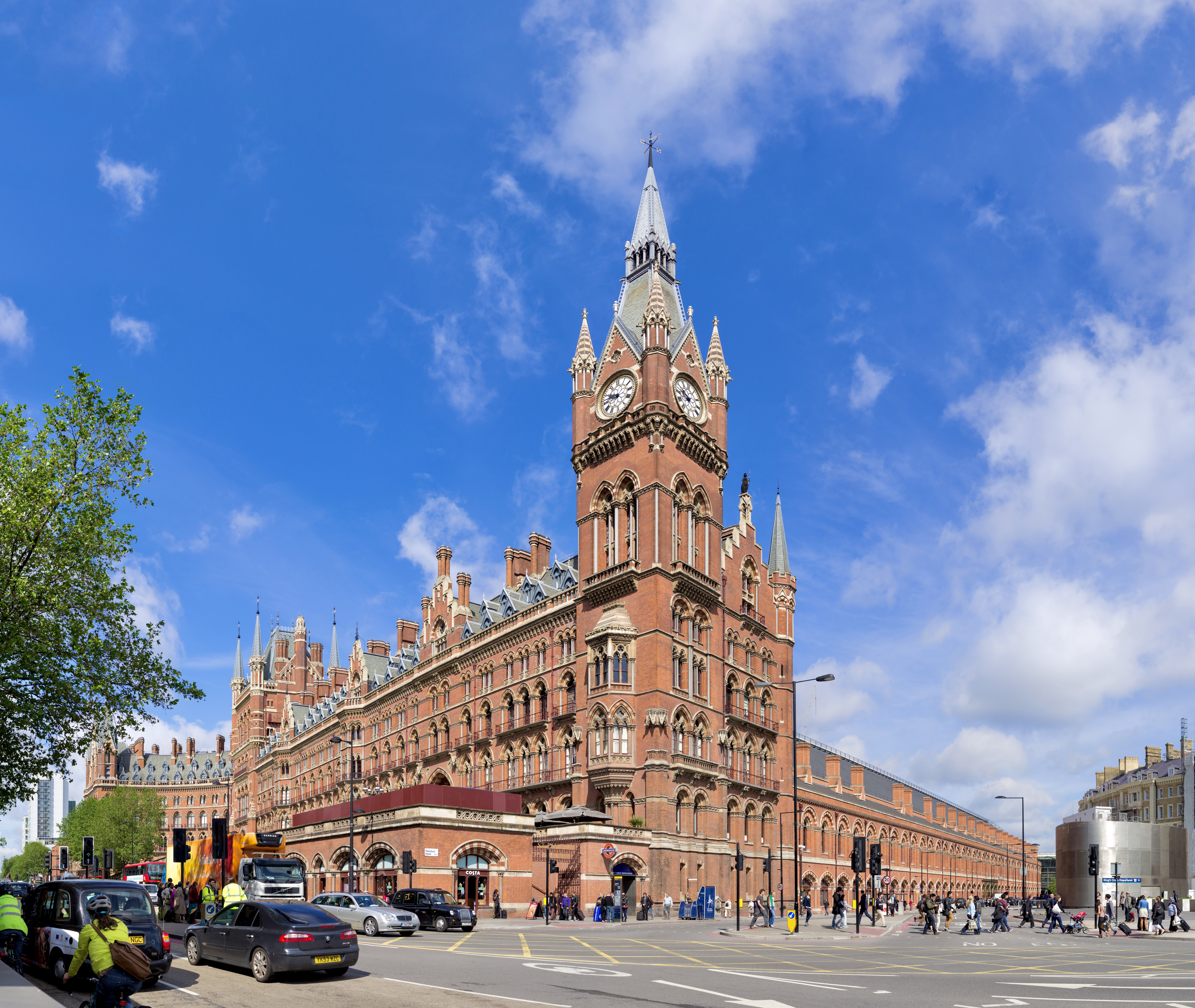
St. Pancras railway station and Midland Hotel in London, opened in 1868

Victorian architecture is a series of architectural revival styles in the mid-to-late 19th century. Victorian refers to the reign of Queen Victoria (1837–1901), called the Victorian era, during which period the styles known as Victorian were used in construction. However, many elements of what is typically termed "Victorian" architecture did not become popular until later in Victoria's reign, roughly from 1850 and later. The styles often included interpretations and eclectic revivals of historic styles (see historicism). The name represents the British and French custom of naming architectural styles for a reigning monarch. Within this naming and classification scheme, it followed Georgian architecture and later Regency architecture and was succeeded by Edwardian architecture.

Although Victoria did not reign over the United States, the term is often used for American styles and buildings from the same period, as well as those from the British Empire.

== Victorian architecture in the United Kingdom ==
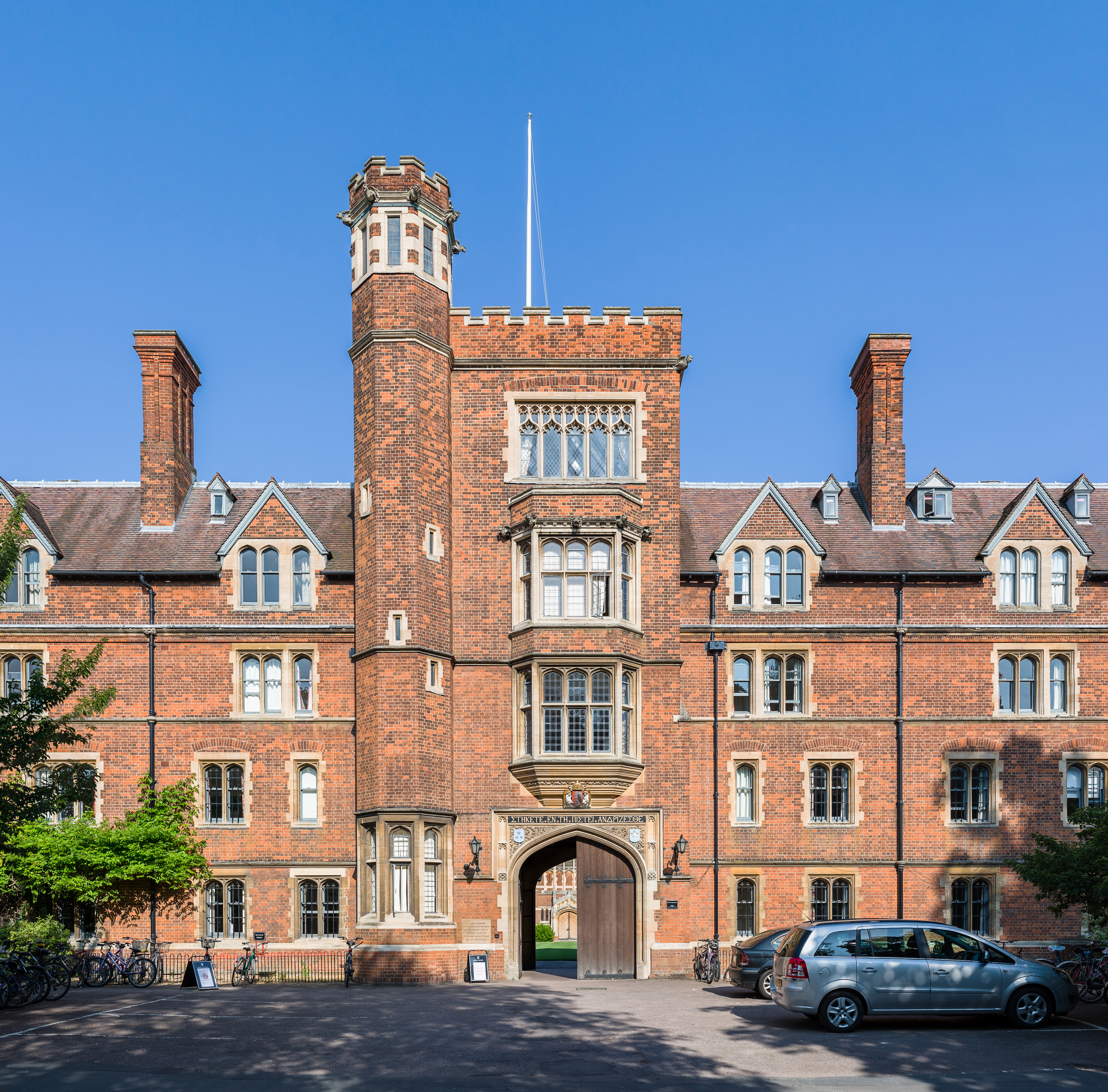
Selwyn College, Cambridge, an example of late Gothic Revival

=== Gothic Revival ===
During the early 19th century, the romantic medieval Gothic Revival style was developed as a reaction to the symmetry of Palladianism, and such buildings as Fonthill Abbey were built.

By the middle of the 19th century, as a result of new technology, construction was able to incorporate metal materials as building components. Structures were erected with cast iron and wrought iron frames. However, due to being weak in tension, these materials were effectively phased out in place for more structurally sound steel. One of the greatest exponents of iron frame construction was Joseph Paxton, architect of the Crystal Palace. Paxton also continued to build such houses as Mentmore Towers, in the still popular English Renaissance styles. New methods of construction were developed in this era of prosperity, but ironically the architectural styles, as developed by such architects as Augustus Pugin, were typically retrospective.

In Scotland, the architect Alexander Thomson who practised in Glasgow was a pioneer of the use of cast iron and steel for commercial buildings, blending neo-classical conventionality with Egyptian and Oriental themes to produce many truly original structures. Other notable Scottish architects of this period are Archibald Simpson and Alexander Marshall Mackenzie, whose stylistically varied work can be seen in the architecture of Aberdeen.

While Scottish architects pioneered this style it soon spread right across the United Kingdom and remained popular for another forty years. Its architectural value in preserving and reinventing the past is significant. Its influences were diverse but the Scottish architects who practiced it were inspired by unique ways to blend architecture, purpose, and everyday life in a meaningful way.

=== Other Revival styles ===
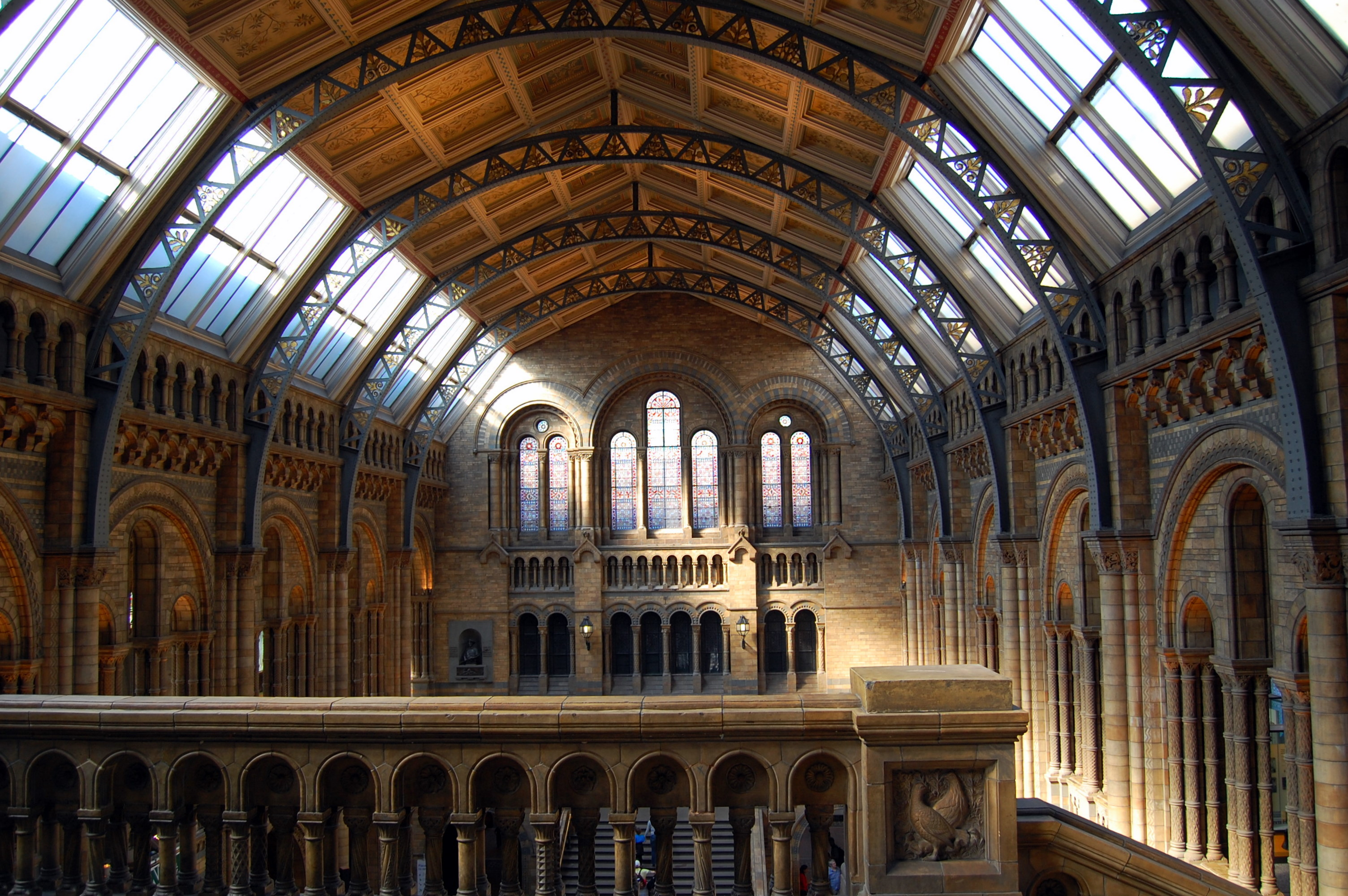
Central Hall of the Natural History Museum, London

- Jacobethan (1830–1870; the precursor to the British Queen Anne Revival style)
- Renaissance Revival (1840–1890)
- Neo-Grec (1845–1865)
- Romanesque Revival
- Second Empire (1855–1880; originated in France)
- British Queen Anne Revival (1870–1910)
- Scots Baronial (predominantly Scotland)
- British Arts and Crafts movement (1880–1910)

Some styles, while not uniquely Victorian, are strongly associated with the 19th century owing to the large number of examples that were erected during that period:

- Italianate
- Neoclassical
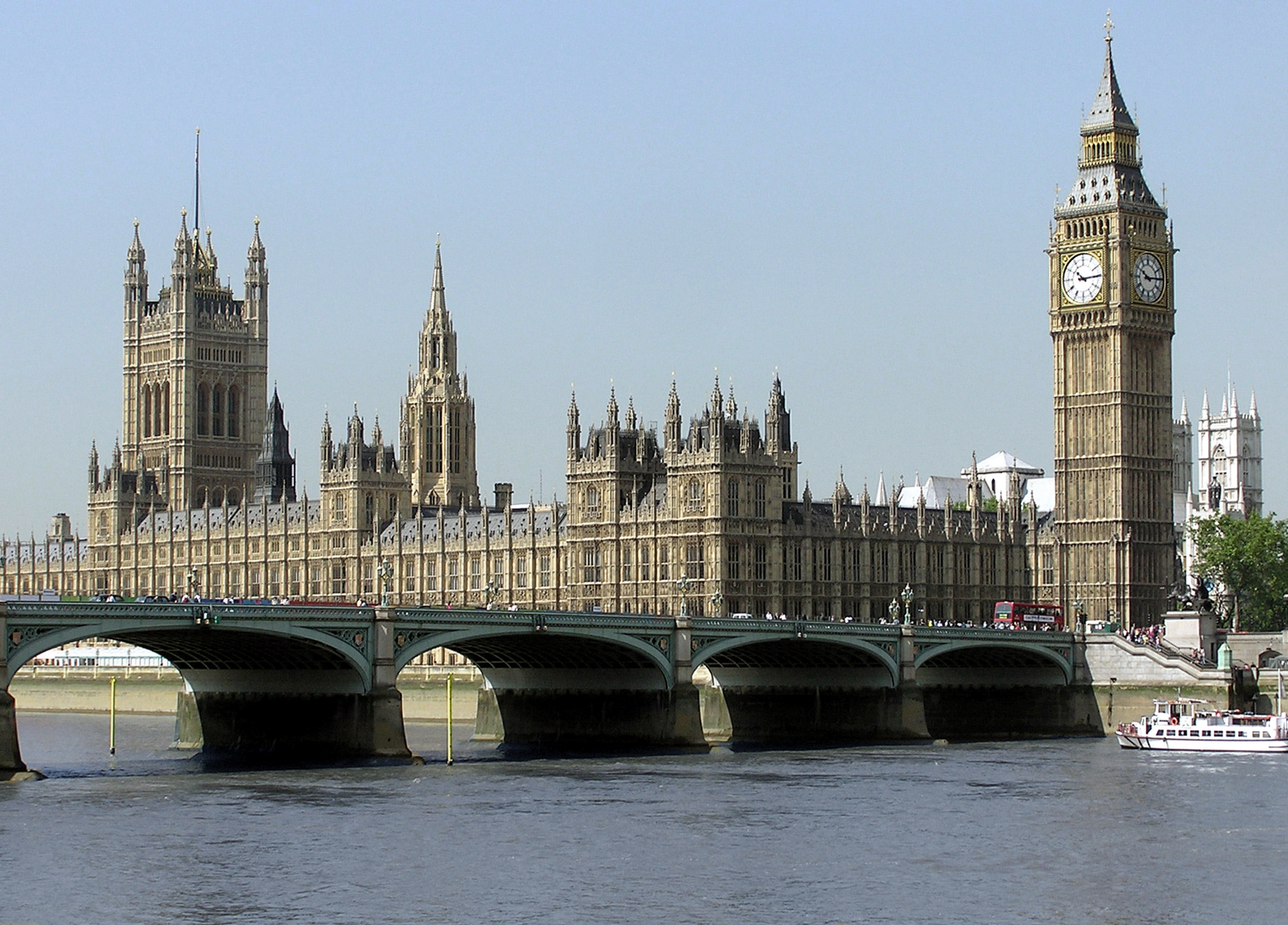
Palace of Westminster, Neo-Gothic completed in 1870. Designed by Sir Charles Barry and Augustus Pugin

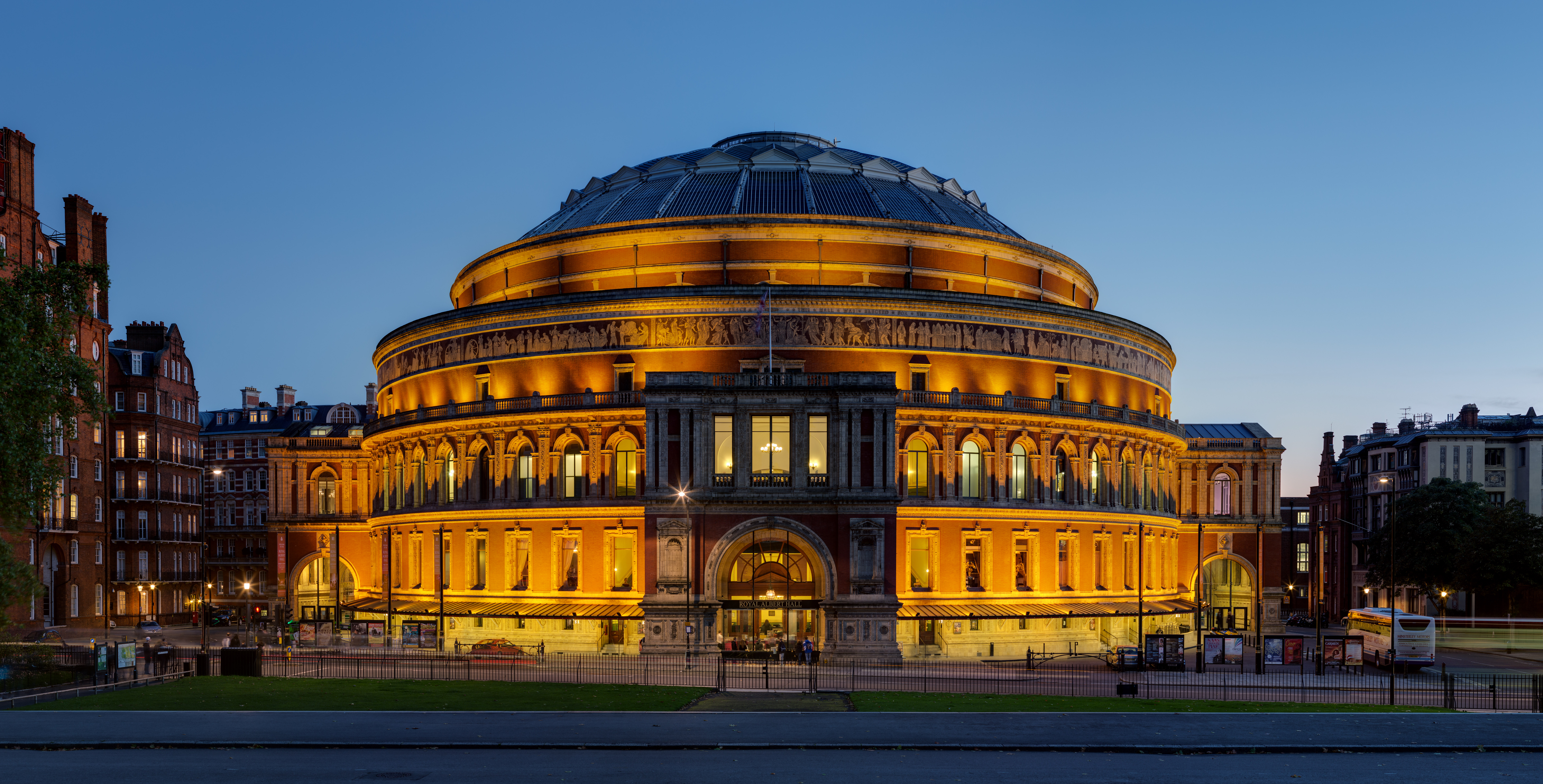
Royal Albert Hall, London

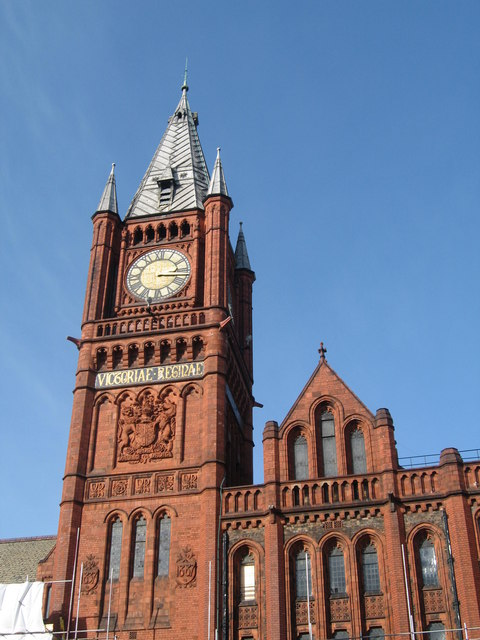
The "Red Brick" Victoria Building at the University of Liverpool, completed in 1893 in Gothic Revival style. Designed by Alfred Waterhouse

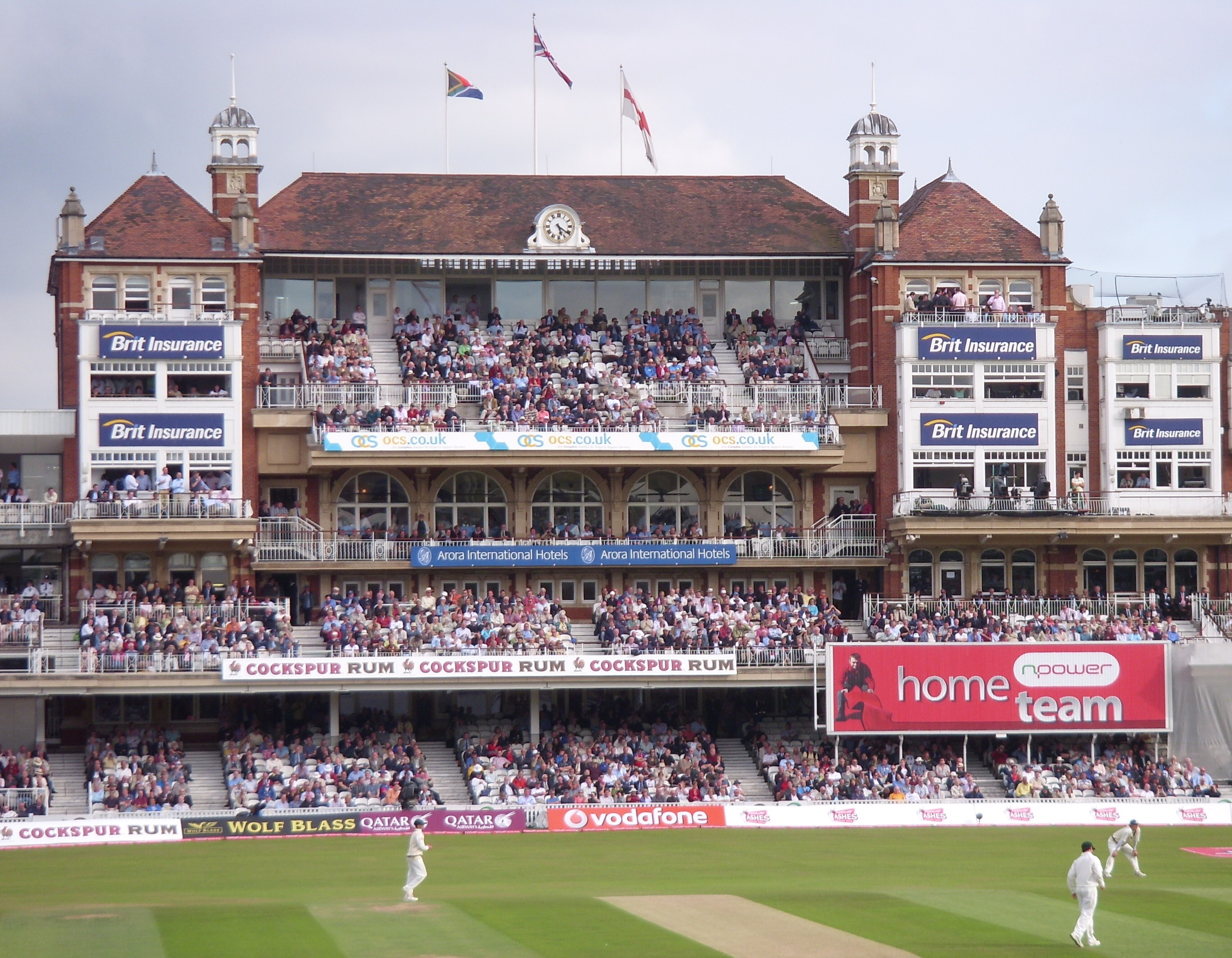
The Victorian Pavilion at The Oval cricket ground in London

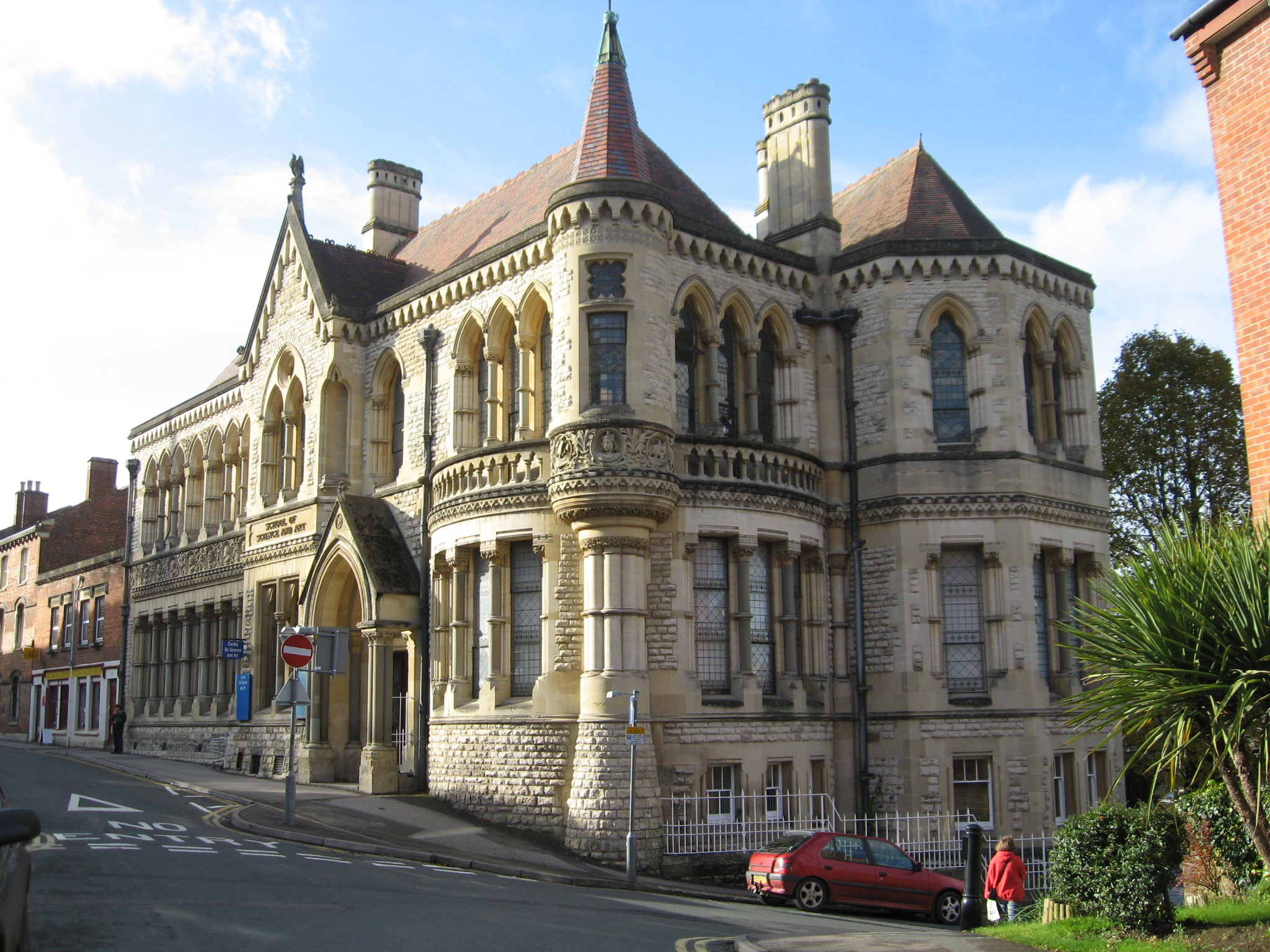
Victorian School of Art and Science at Stroud, Gloucestershire

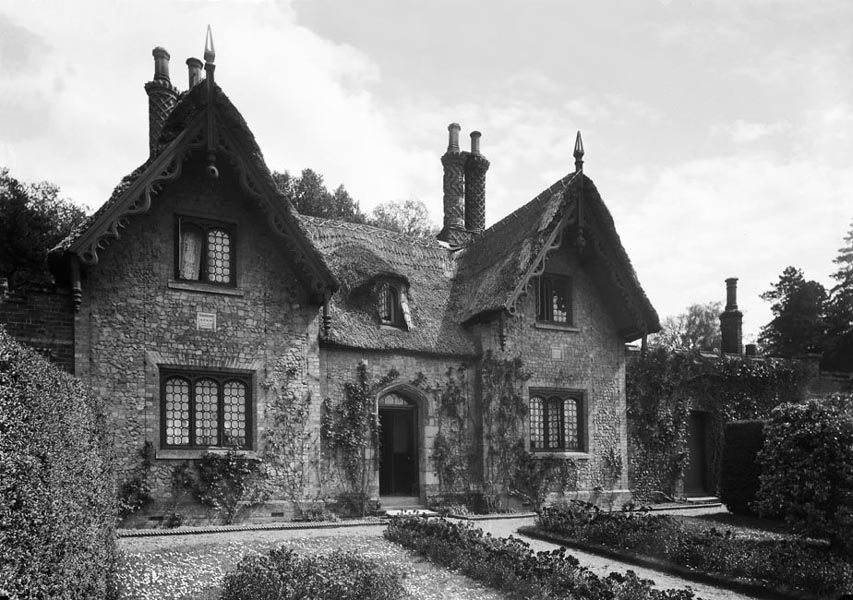
House on the Hardwick House estate near Bury St Edmunds, Suffolk

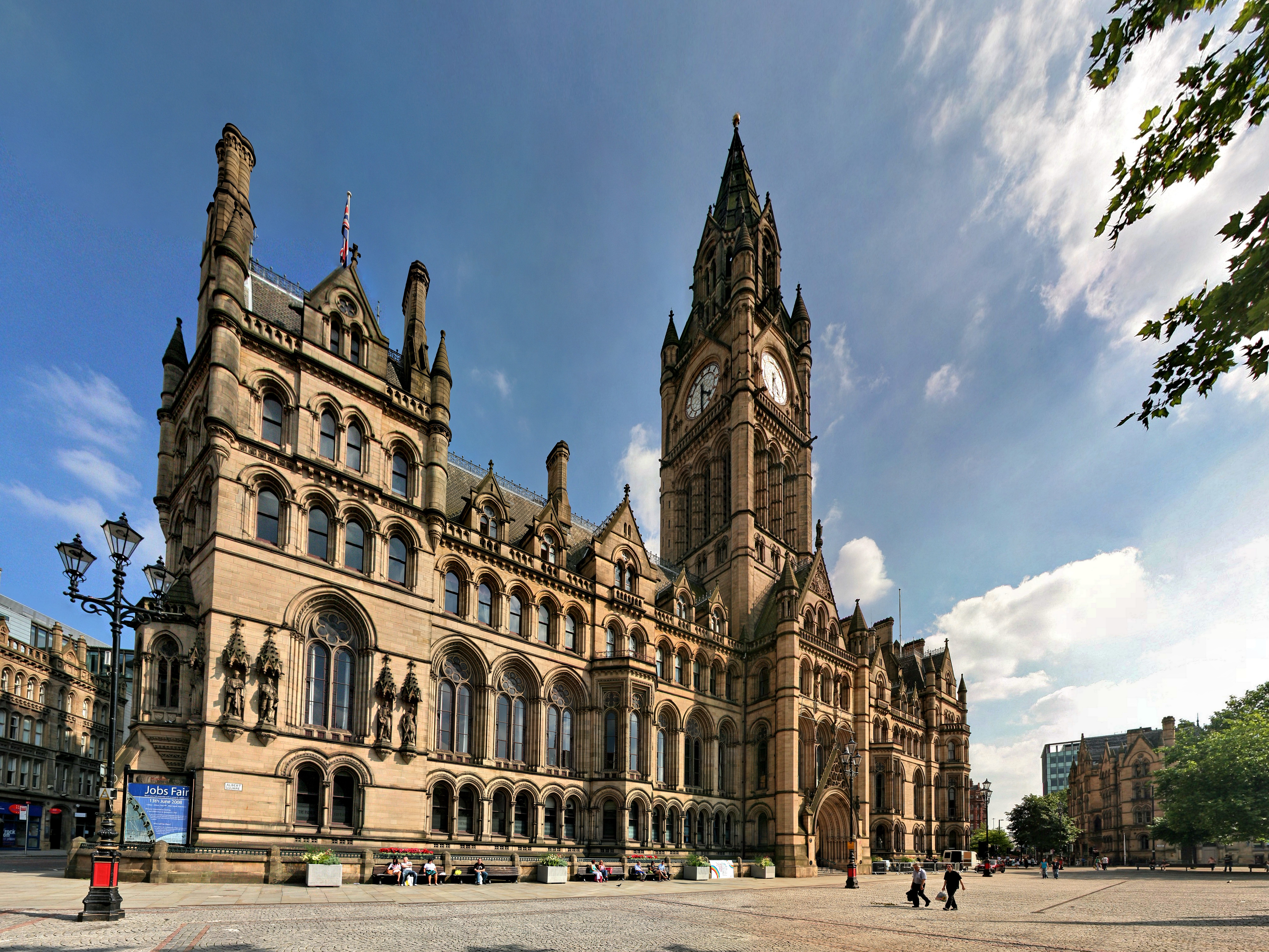
Manchester Town Hall

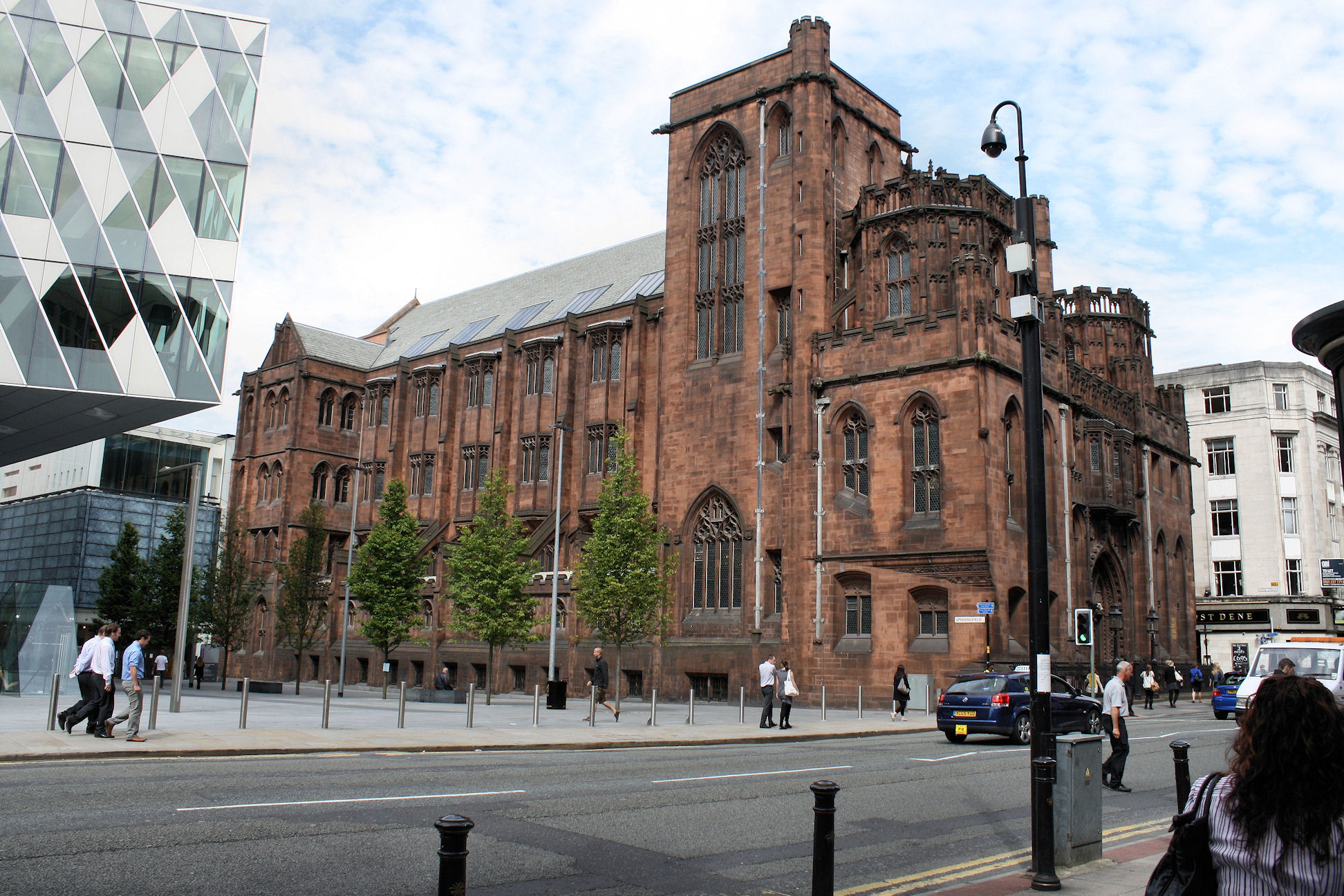
The John Rylands Library in Manchester

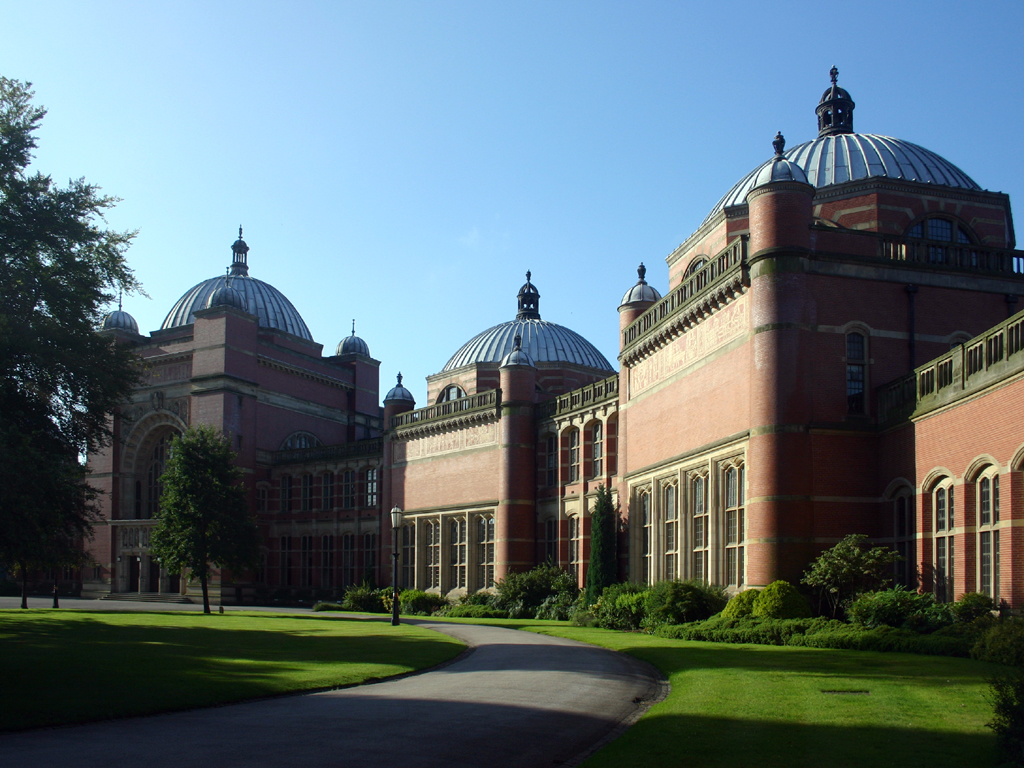
The Aston Webb building at the University of Birmingham, UK

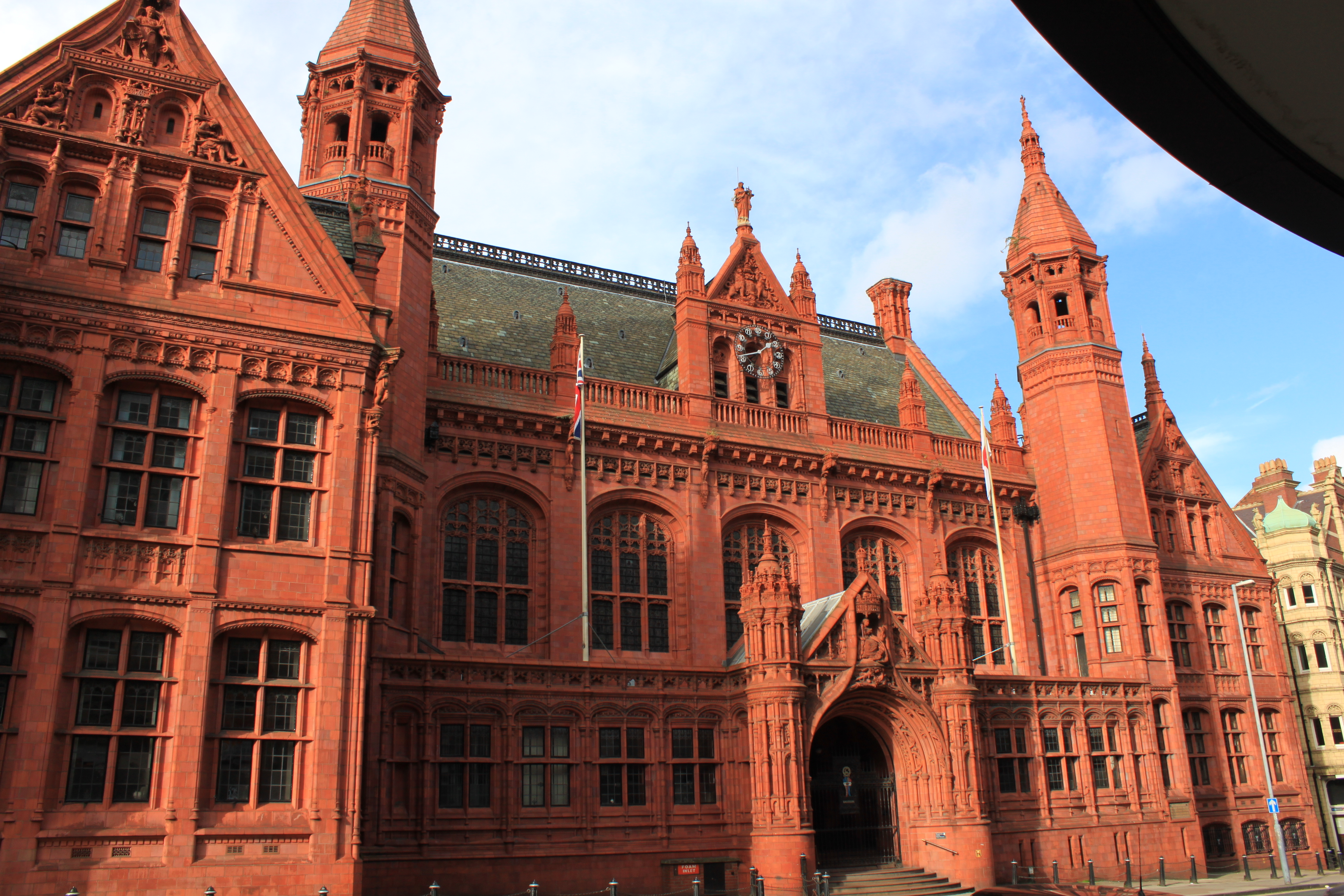
Victoria Law Courts, Birmingham, UK

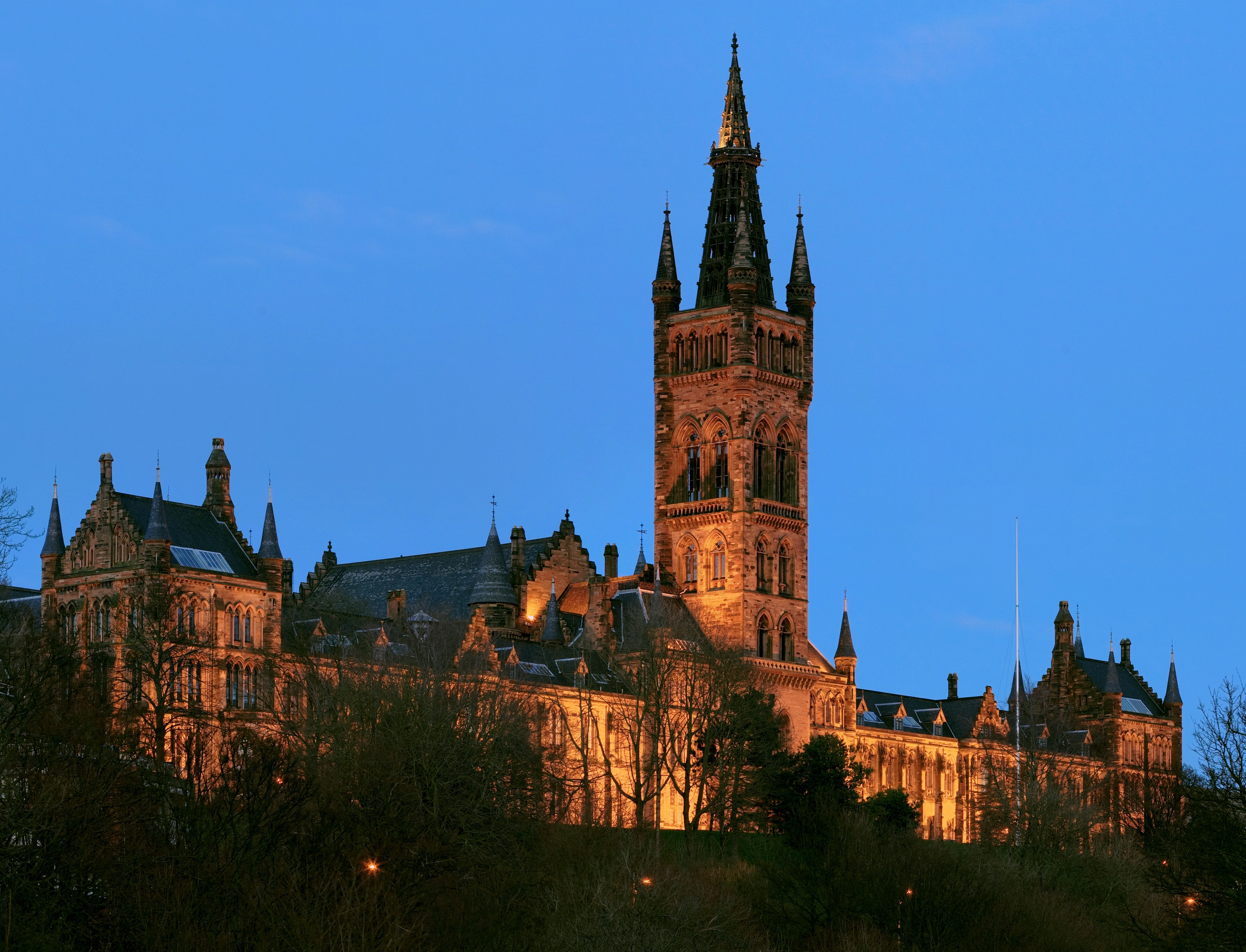
The Gilbert Scott Building of the University of Glasgow, as viewed from Kelvingrove Park, Glasgow. An example of the Gothic Revival style

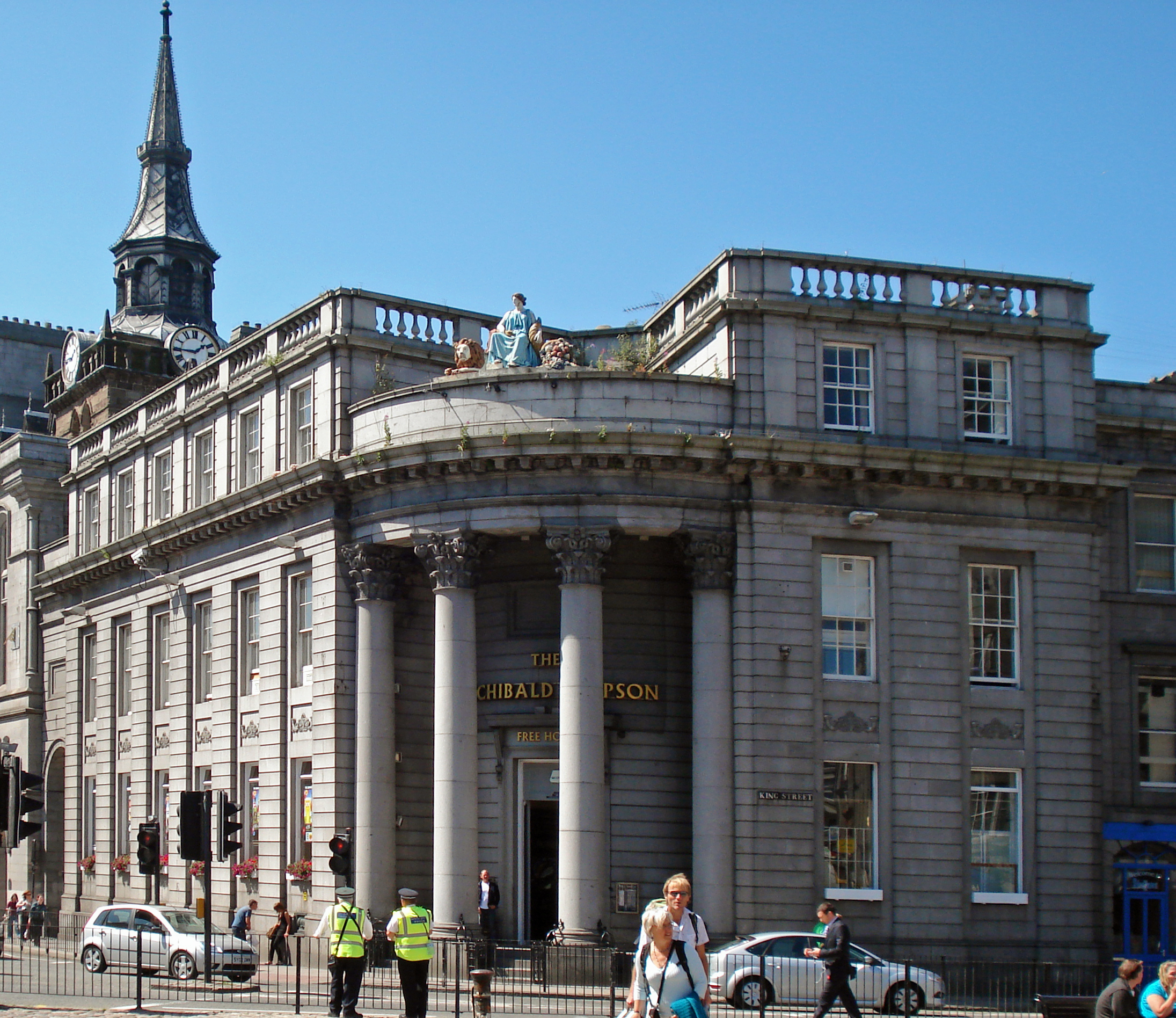
North of Scotland Bank in Aberdeen by Archibald Simpson 1839–42

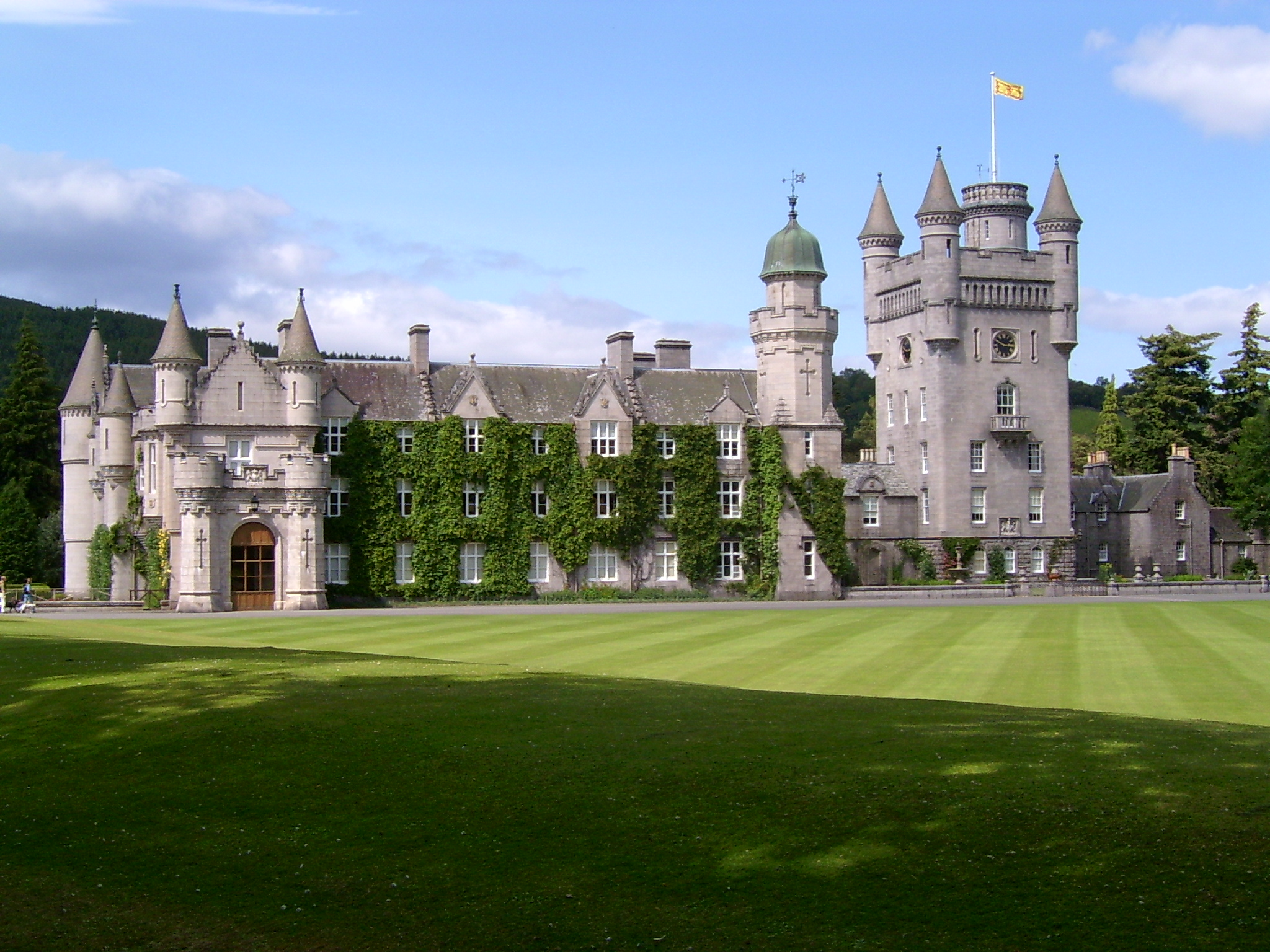
Balmoral Castle, completely rebuilt for Queen Victoria, an example of the Scots Baronial style

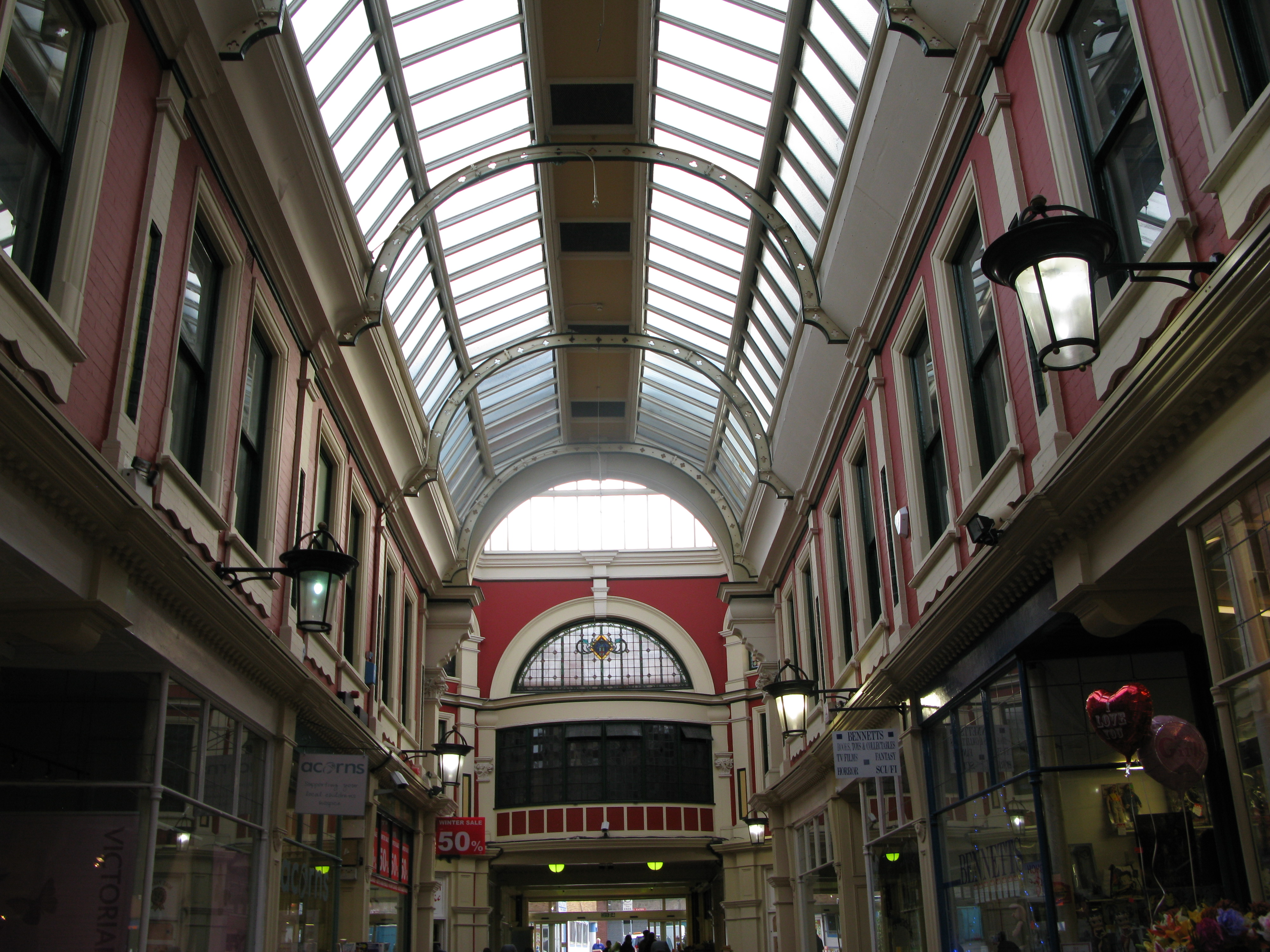
Walsall Victorian Arcade, UK

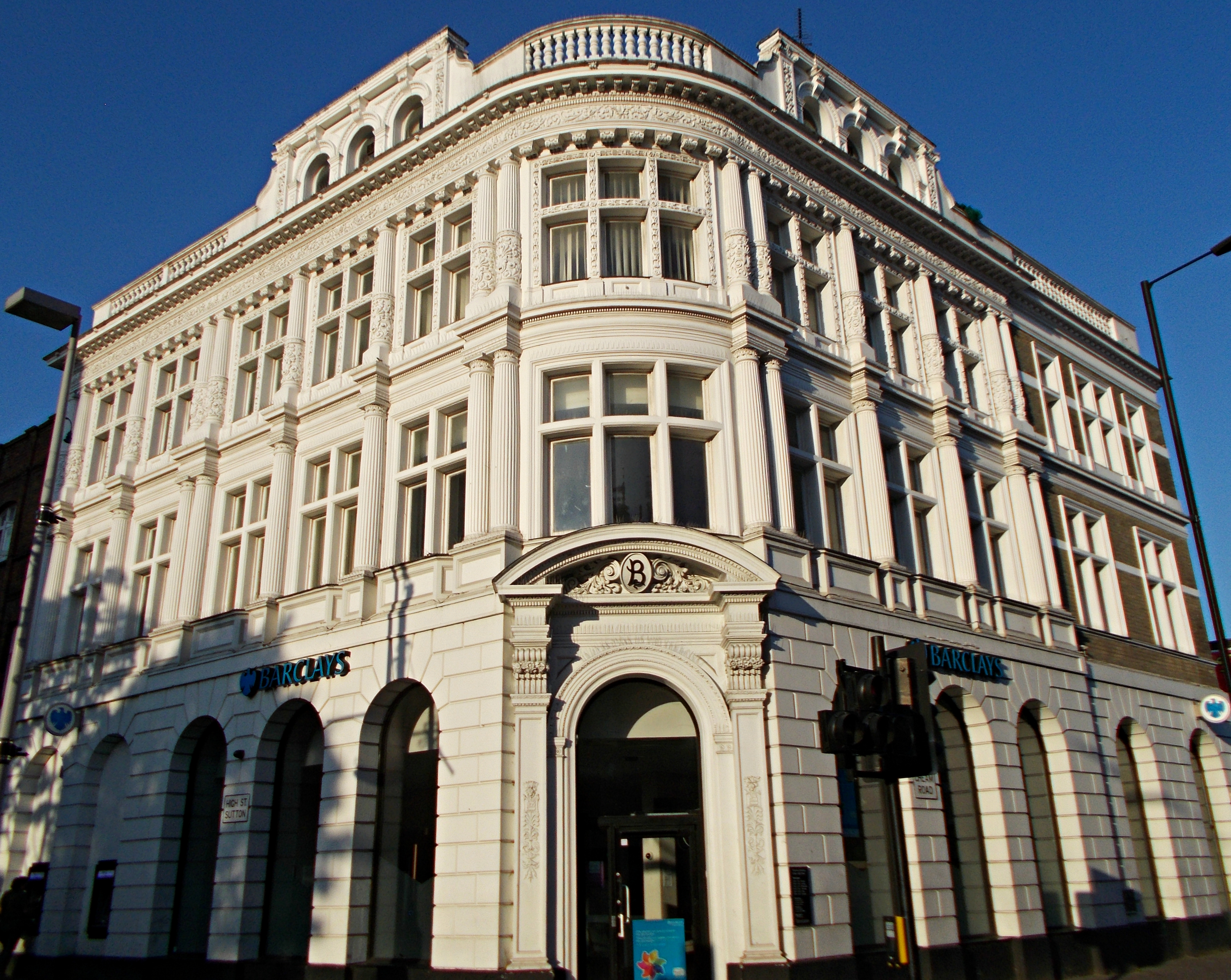
Barclays Bank building, Sutton, Greater London

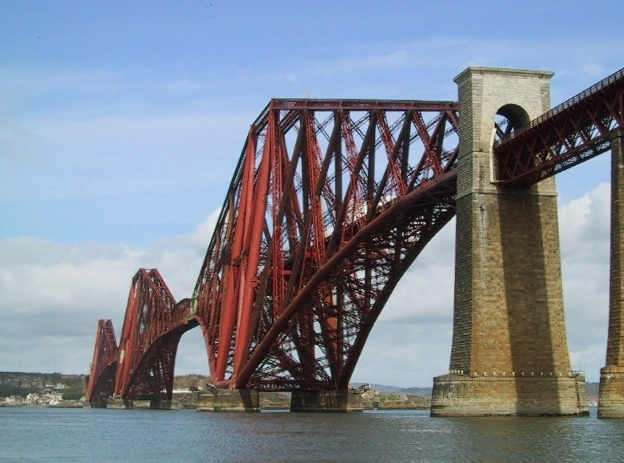
Forth Rail Bridge, Firth of Forth, near Edinburgh, Scotland, UK

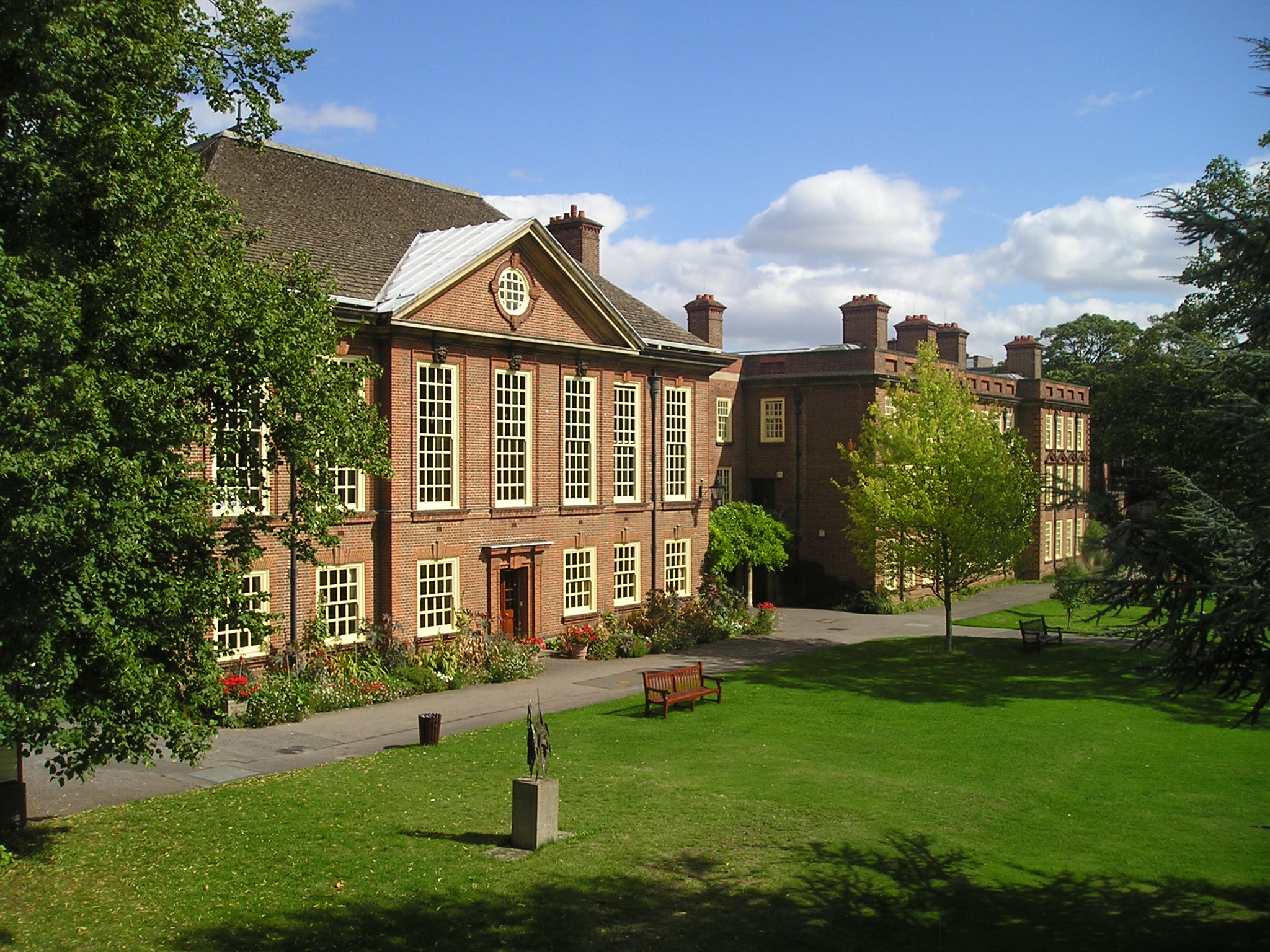
Somerville College, Oxford, UK

== International spread of Victorian styles ==
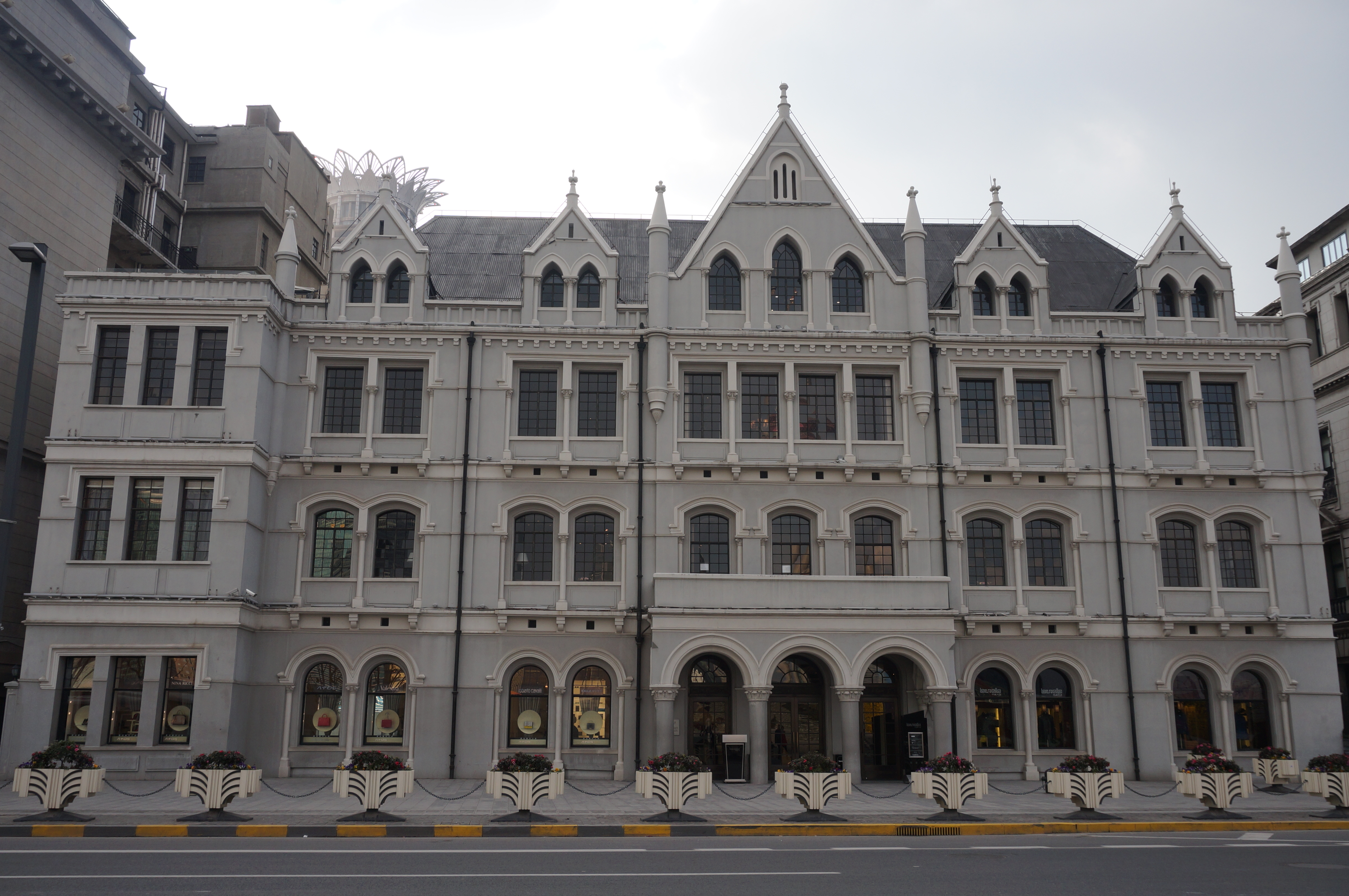
The China Merchants Bank Building is an example of Victorian architecture found in Shanghai, China.

During the 18th century, a few English architects emigrated to the colonies, but as the British Empire became firmly established during the 19th century, many architects emigrated at the start of their careers. Some chose the United States, and others went to Canada, Australia, New Zealand, and South Africa. Normally, they applied architectural styles that were fashionable when they left England. By the latter half of the century, however, improving transport and communications meant that even remote parts of the Empire had access to publications such as the magazine The Builder, which helped colonial architects keep informed about current fashion. Thus, the influence of English architecture spread across the world. Several prominent architects produced English-derived designs around the world, including William Butterfield (St Peter's Cathedral, Adelaide) and Jacob Wrey Mould (Chief Architect of Public Works in New York City).

=== Australia ===
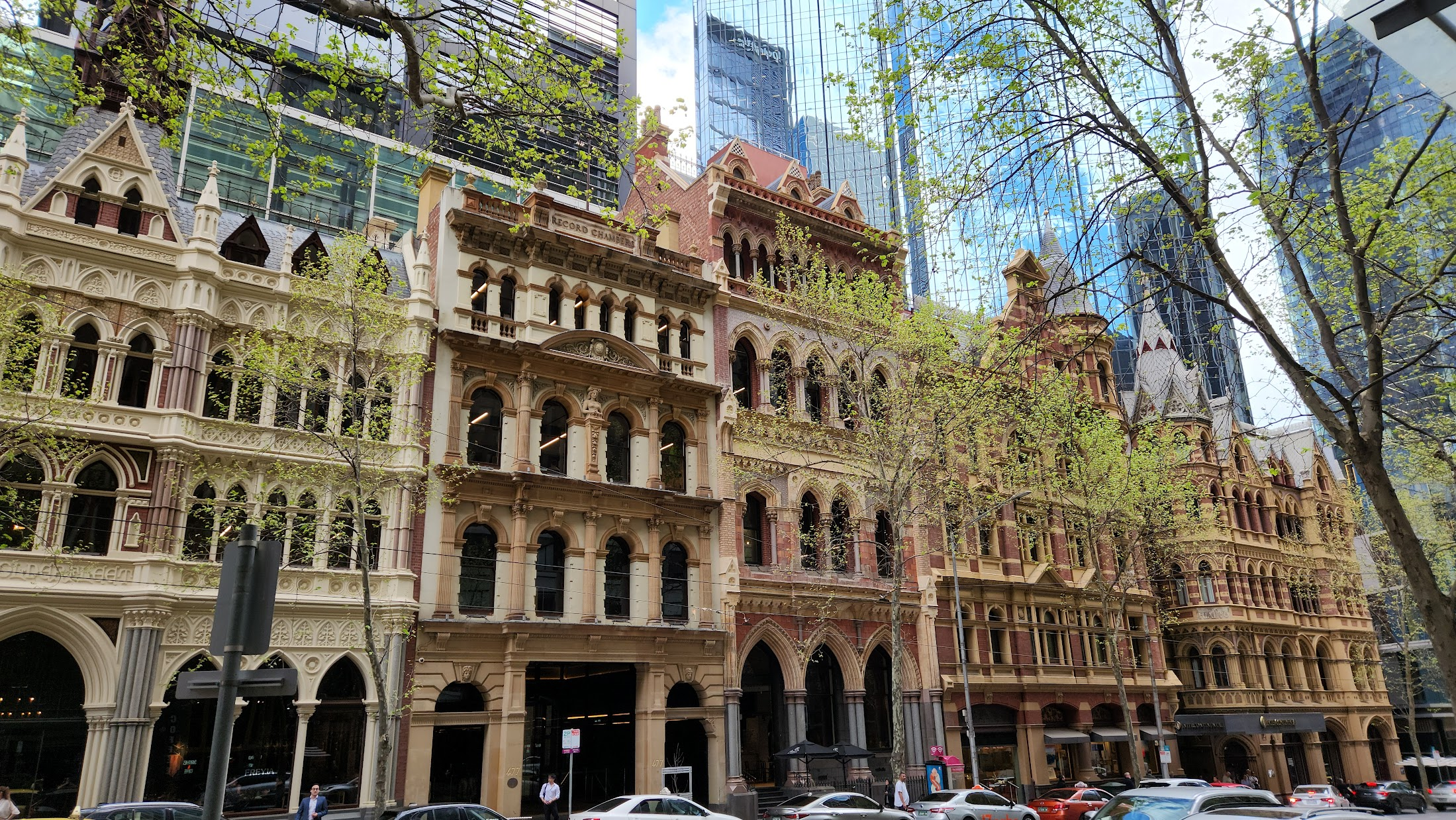
Modern skyscrapers on Collins Street, Melbourne, have been deliberately set back from the street in order to retain Victorian-era buildings.

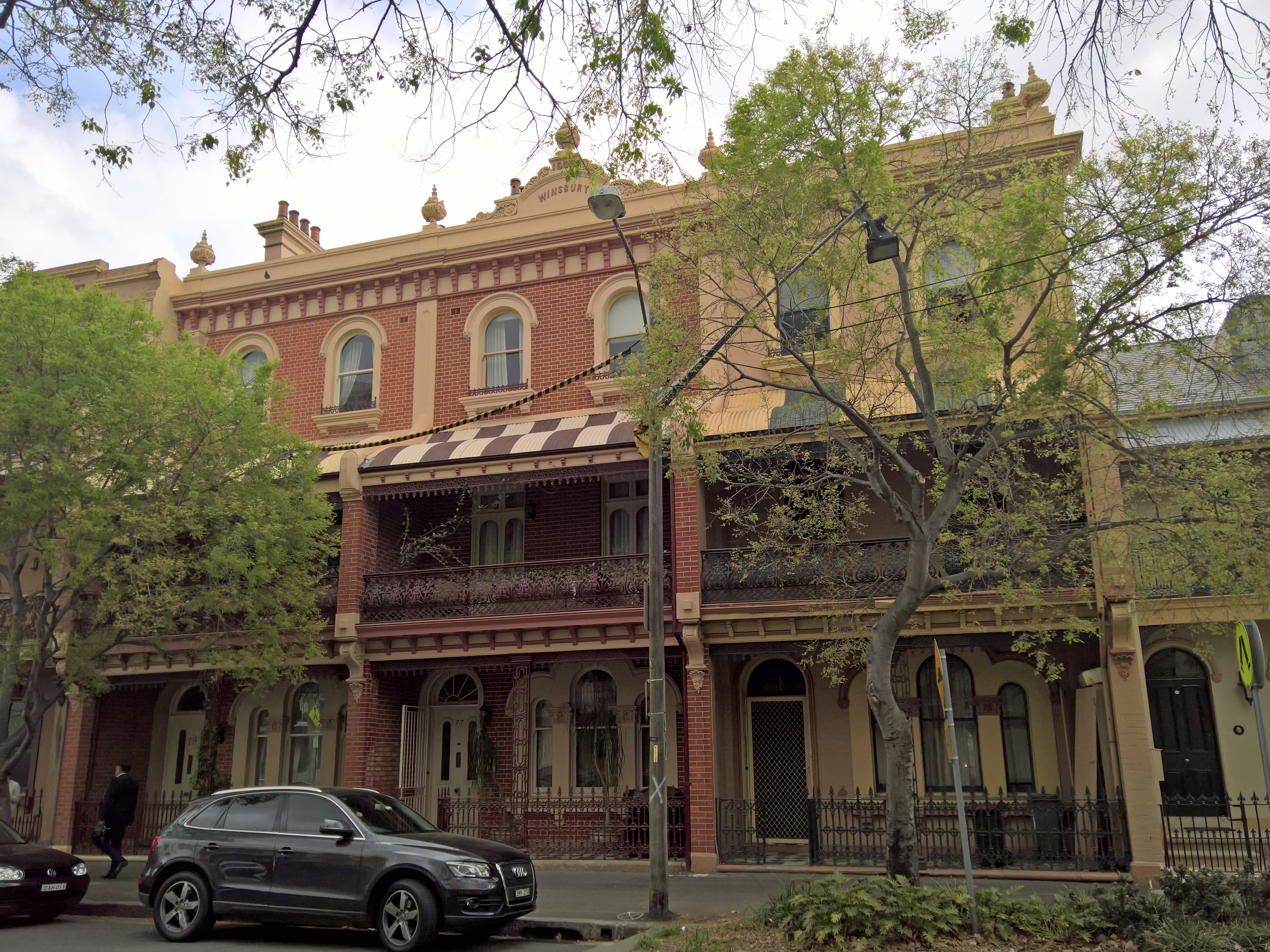
Most terraces in Australia have been preserved. Pictured are Victorian style terraces in Sydney

The Victorian period flourished in Australia and is generally recognised as being from 1840 to 1890, which saw a gold rush and population boom during the 1880s in the states of New South Wales and Victoria. There were fifteen styles that predominated:

- Victorian Georgian
- Victorian Regency
- Egyptian
- Academic Classical
- Free Classical
- Filigree
- Mannerist
- Second Empire
- Italianate
- Romanesque
- Tudor
- Academic Gothic
- Free Gothic
- Rustic Gothic
- Carpenter Gothic

The Arts and Crafts style and Queen Anne style are considered to be part of the Federation Period, from 1890 to 1915.

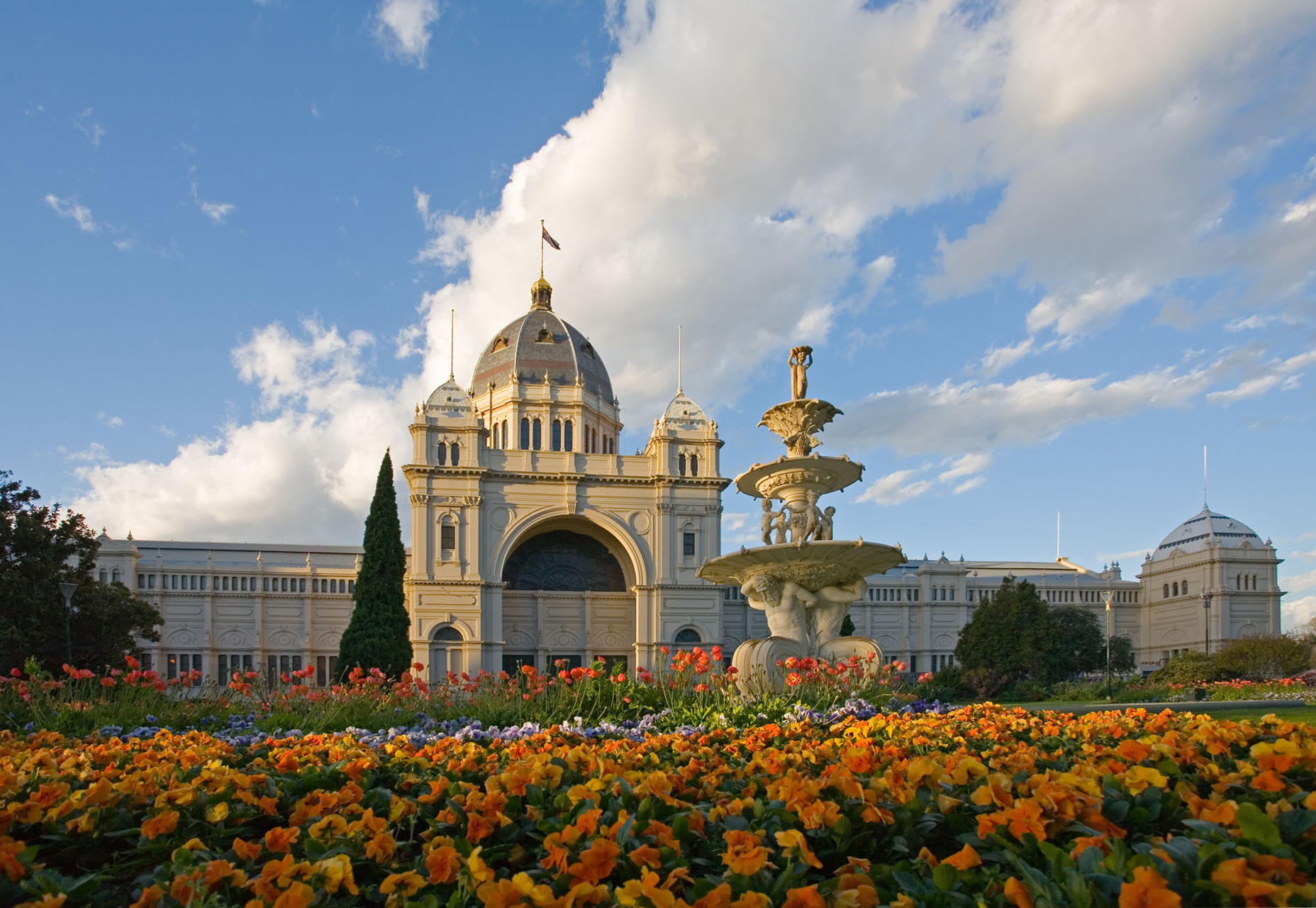
Melbourne's world heritage Royal Exhibition Building, built in 1880 (Free Classical)

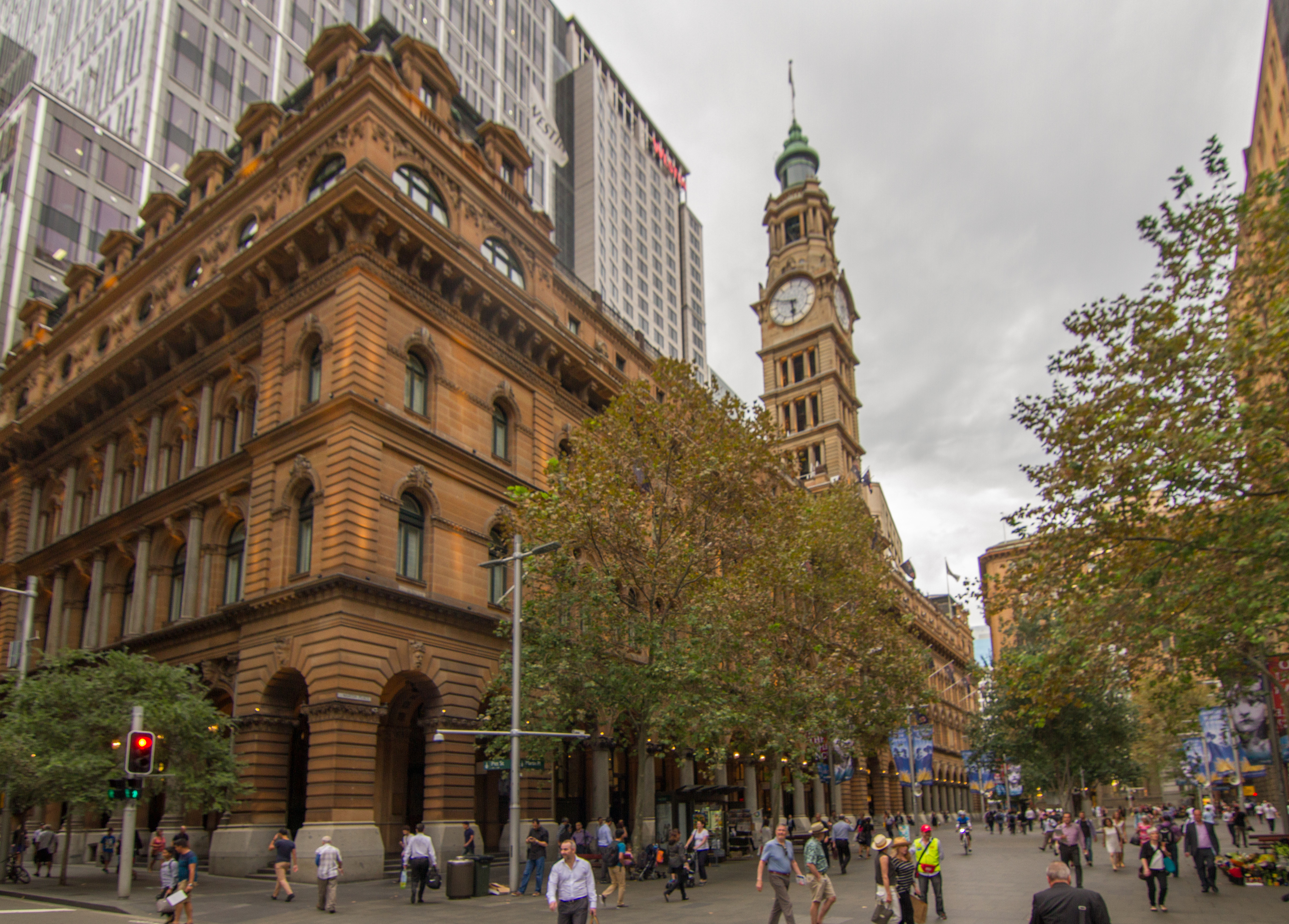
General Post Office, Sydney, in the Free Classical style (1891)

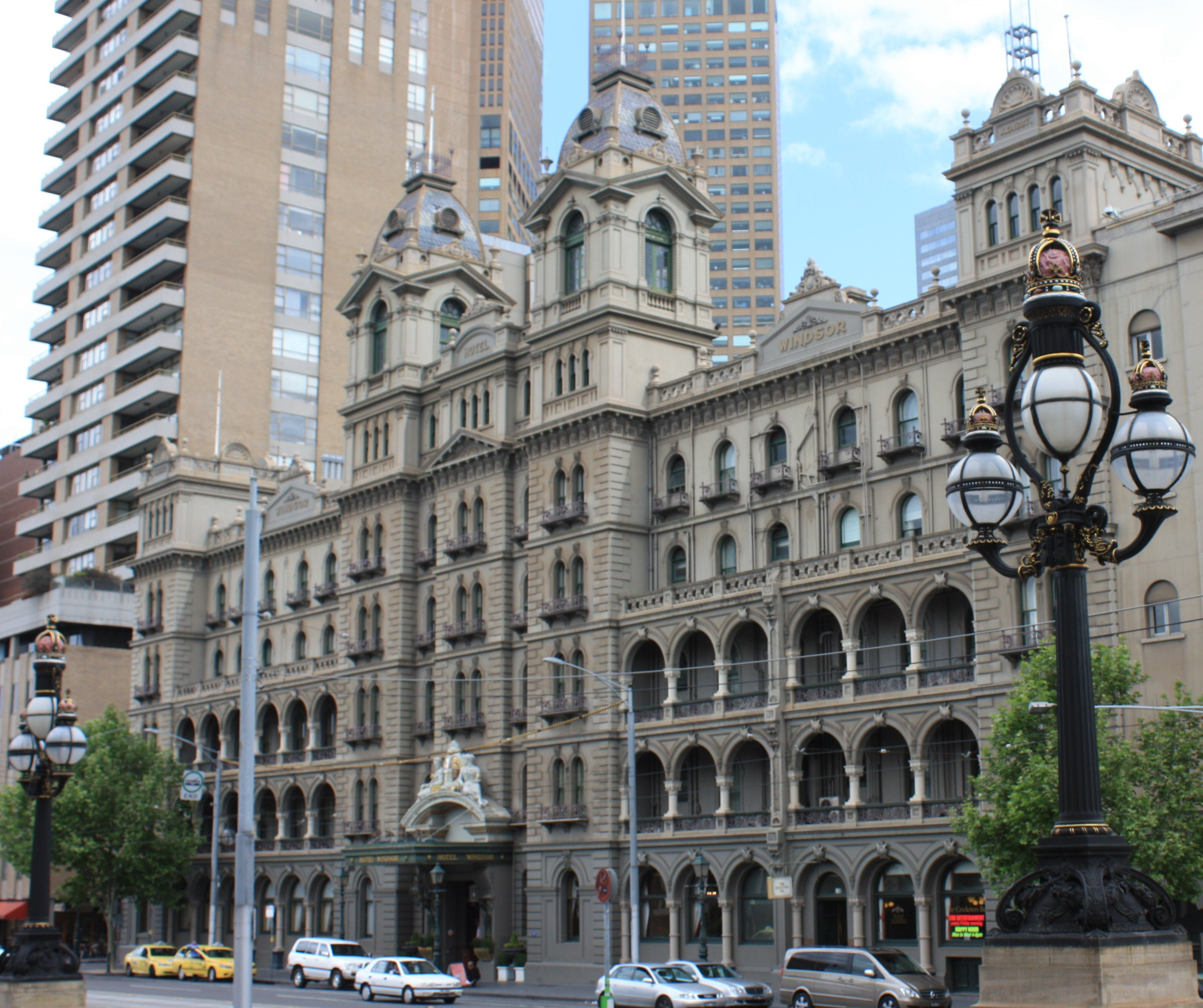
Hotel Windsor, Melbourne, 1885

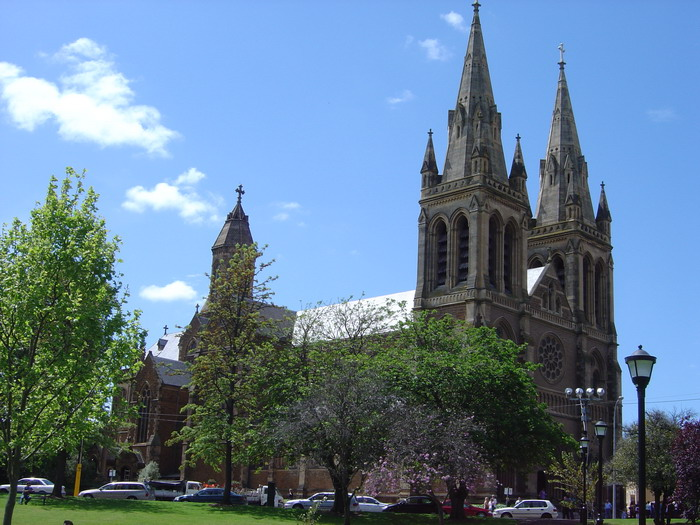
St Peter's Cathedral, Adelaide (Gothic Revival)

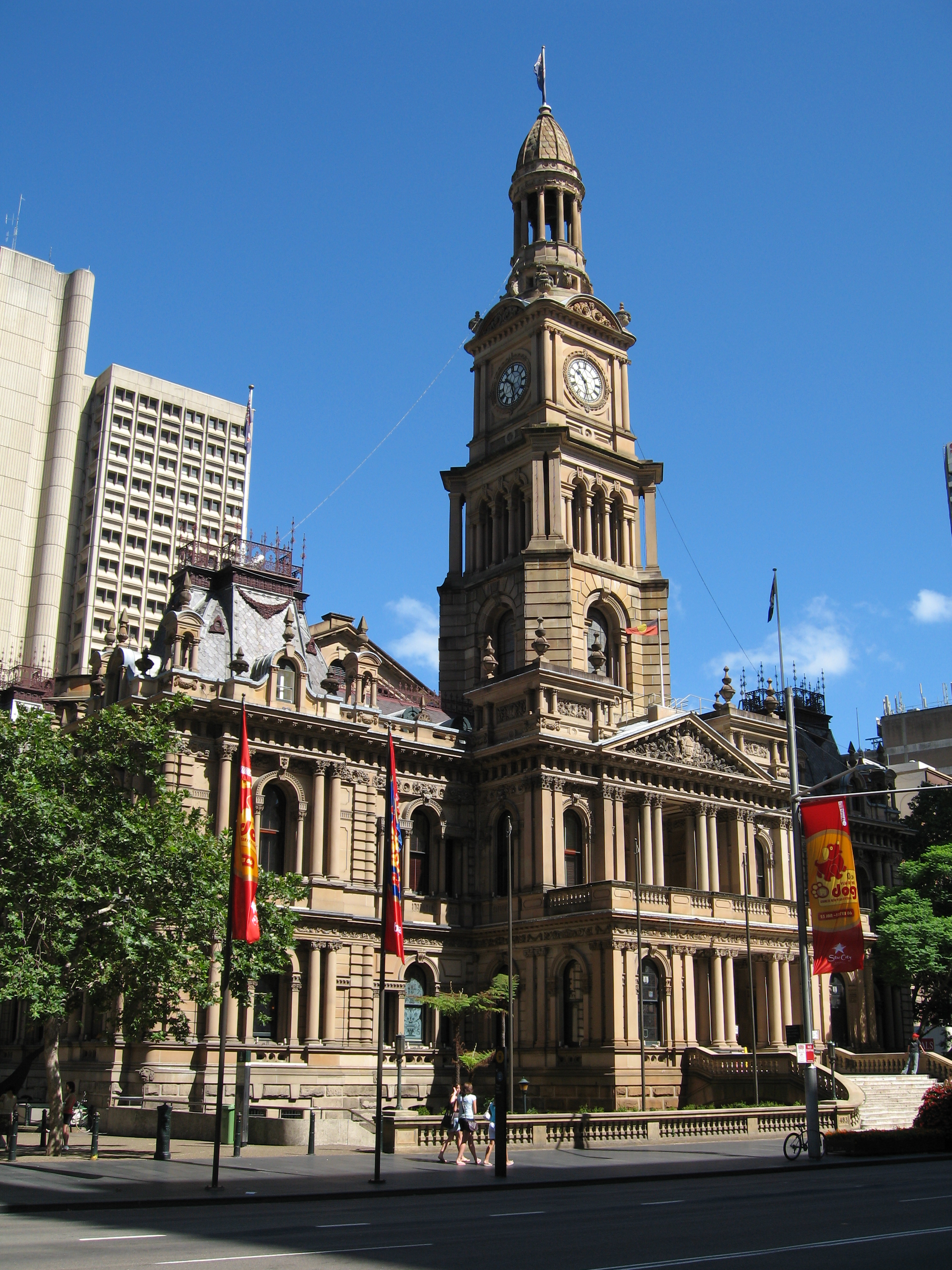
Sydney Town Hall, in Second Empire style

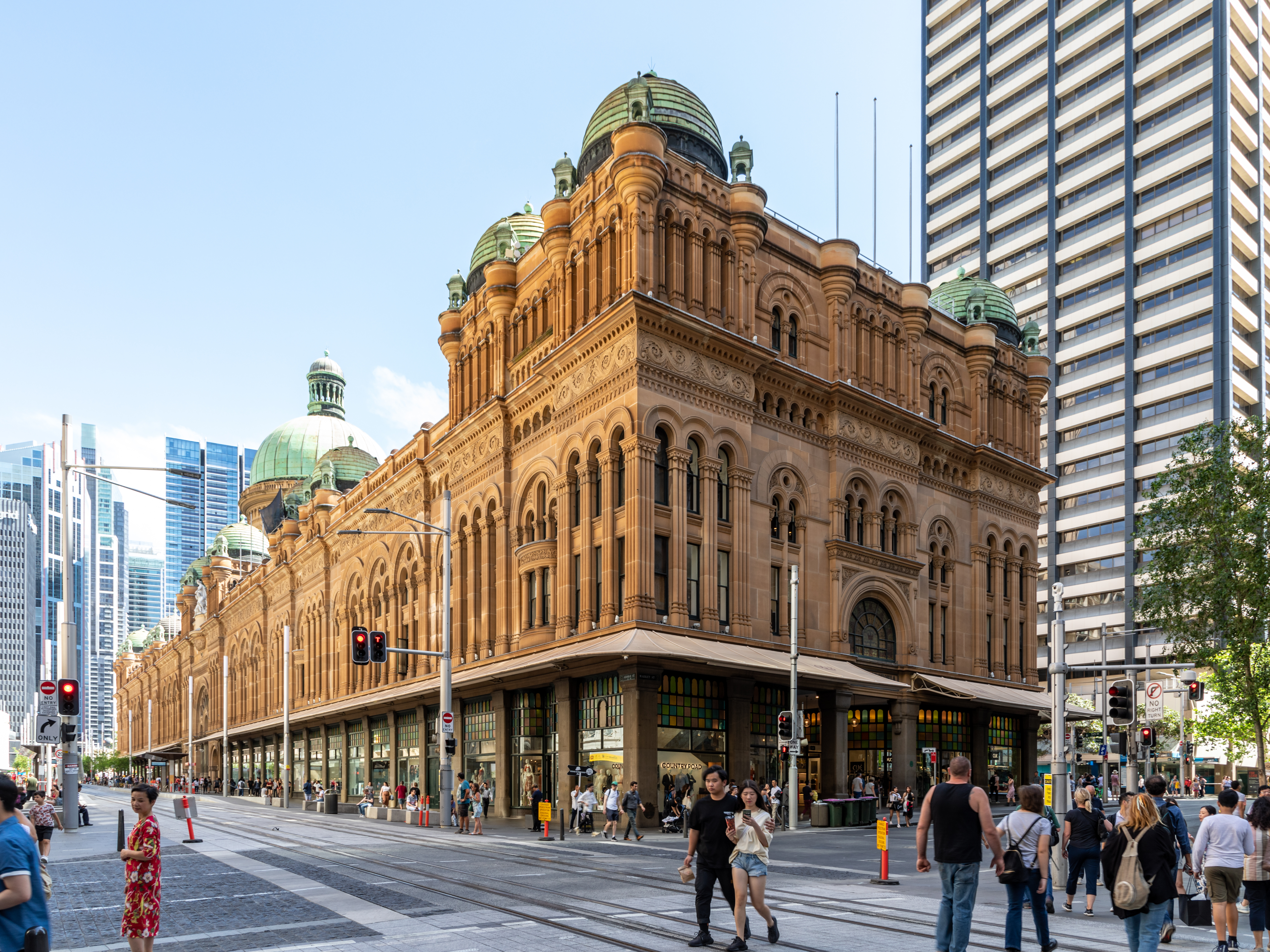
Queen Victoria Building in Romanesque style (1898)

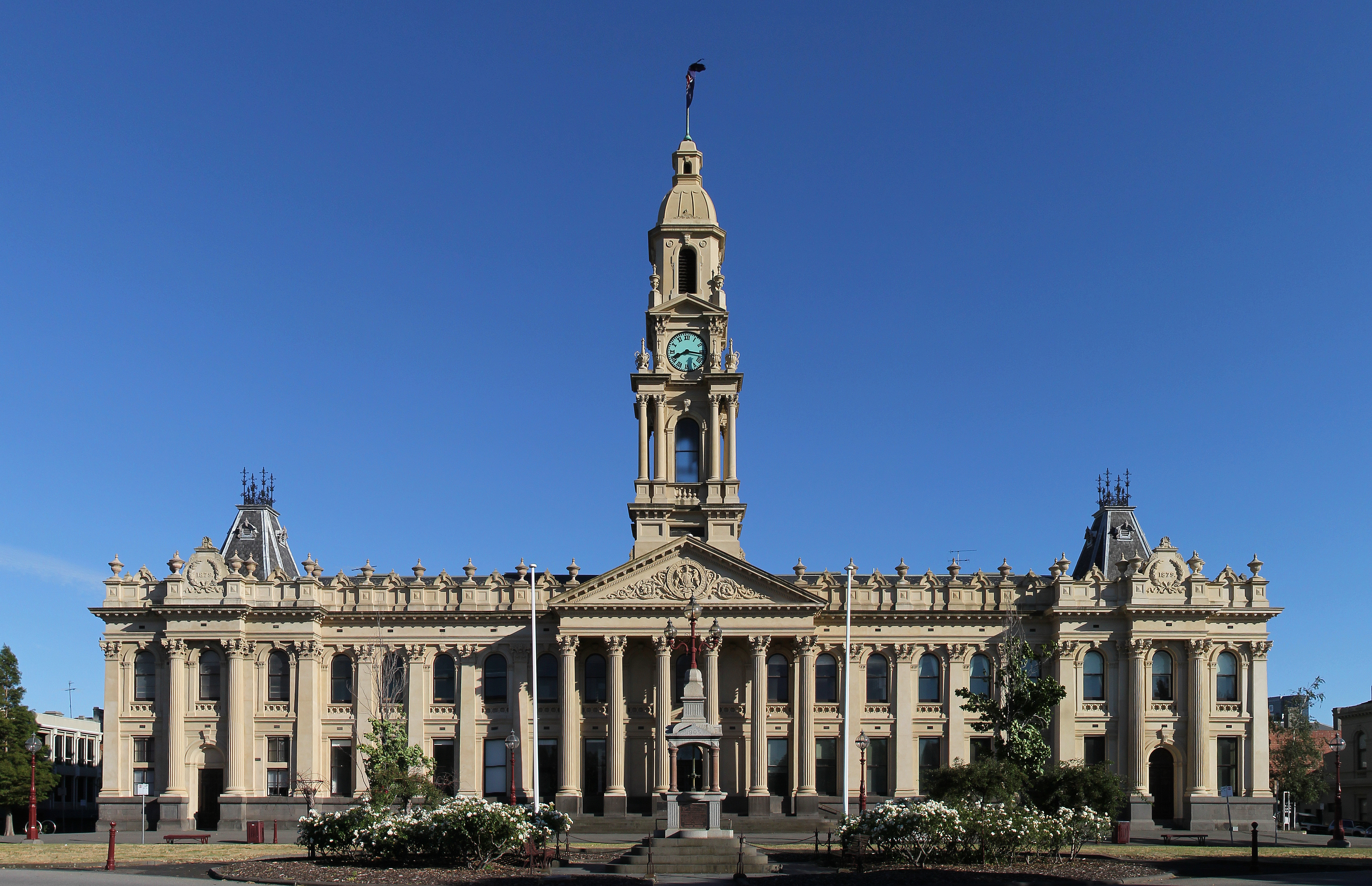
South Melbourne Town Hall in Second Empire style

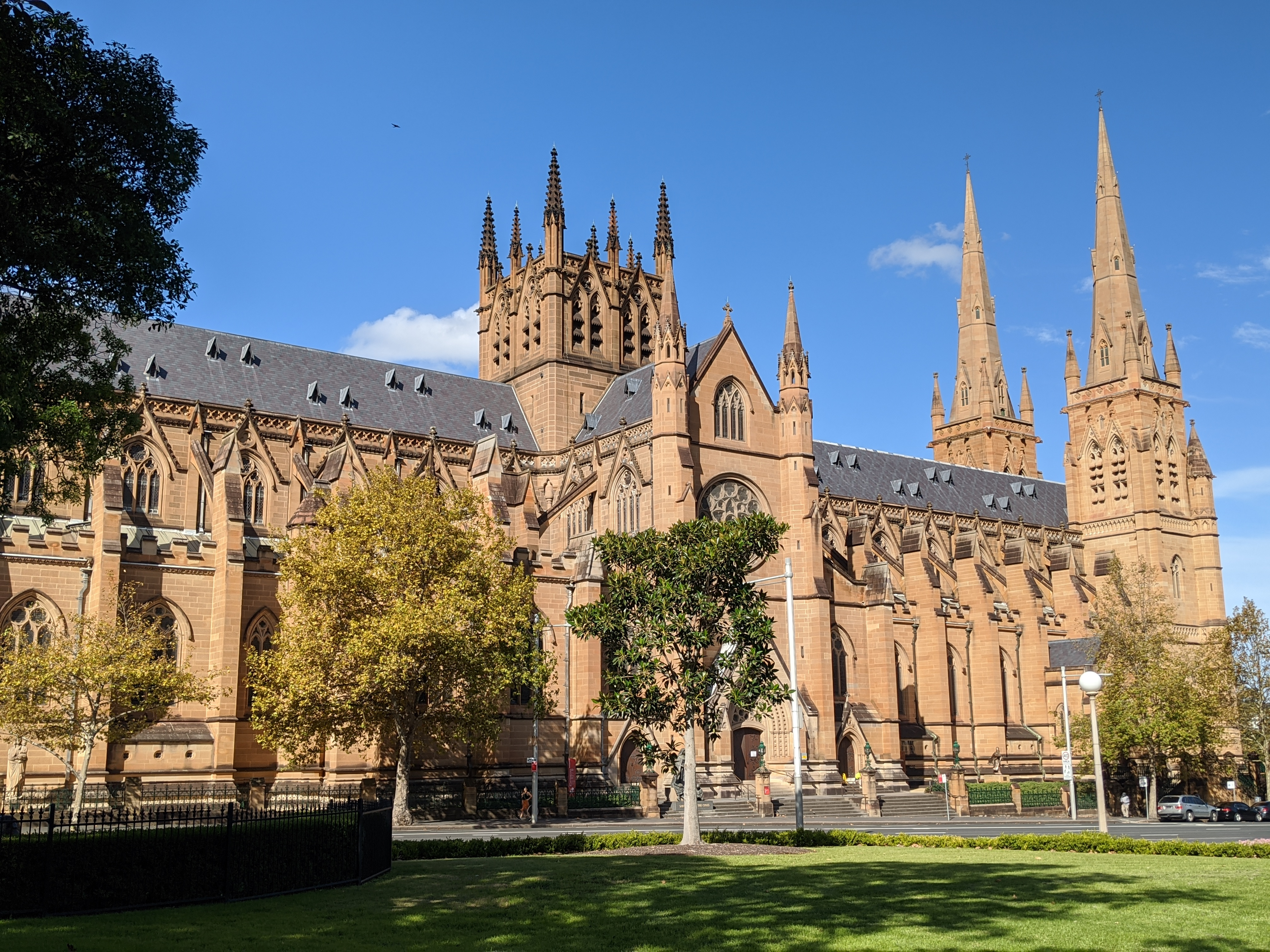
St Mary's Cathedral, Sydney, in Victorian Gothic architecture (1882)

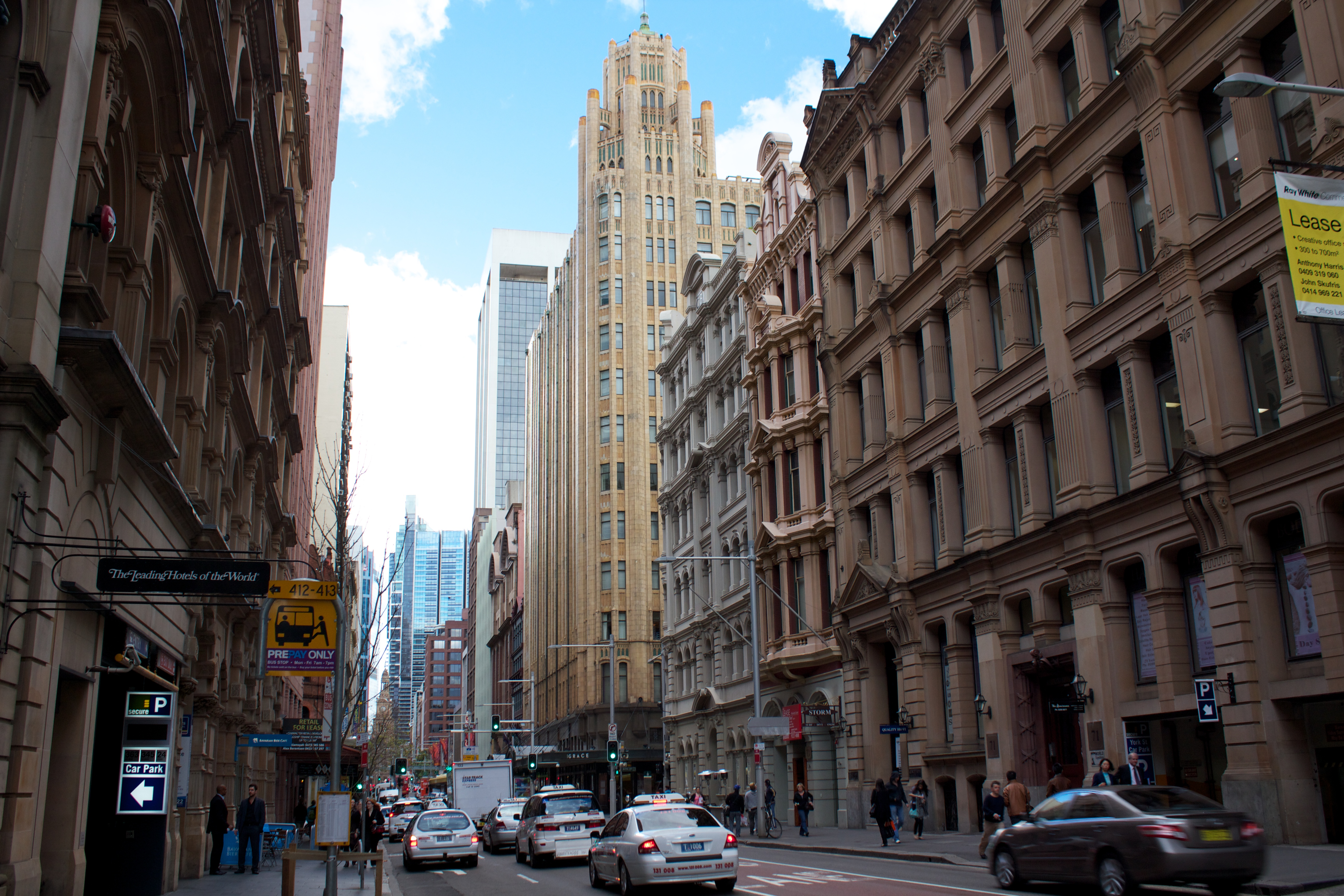
Victorian Mannerist architecture lining a street in Sydney

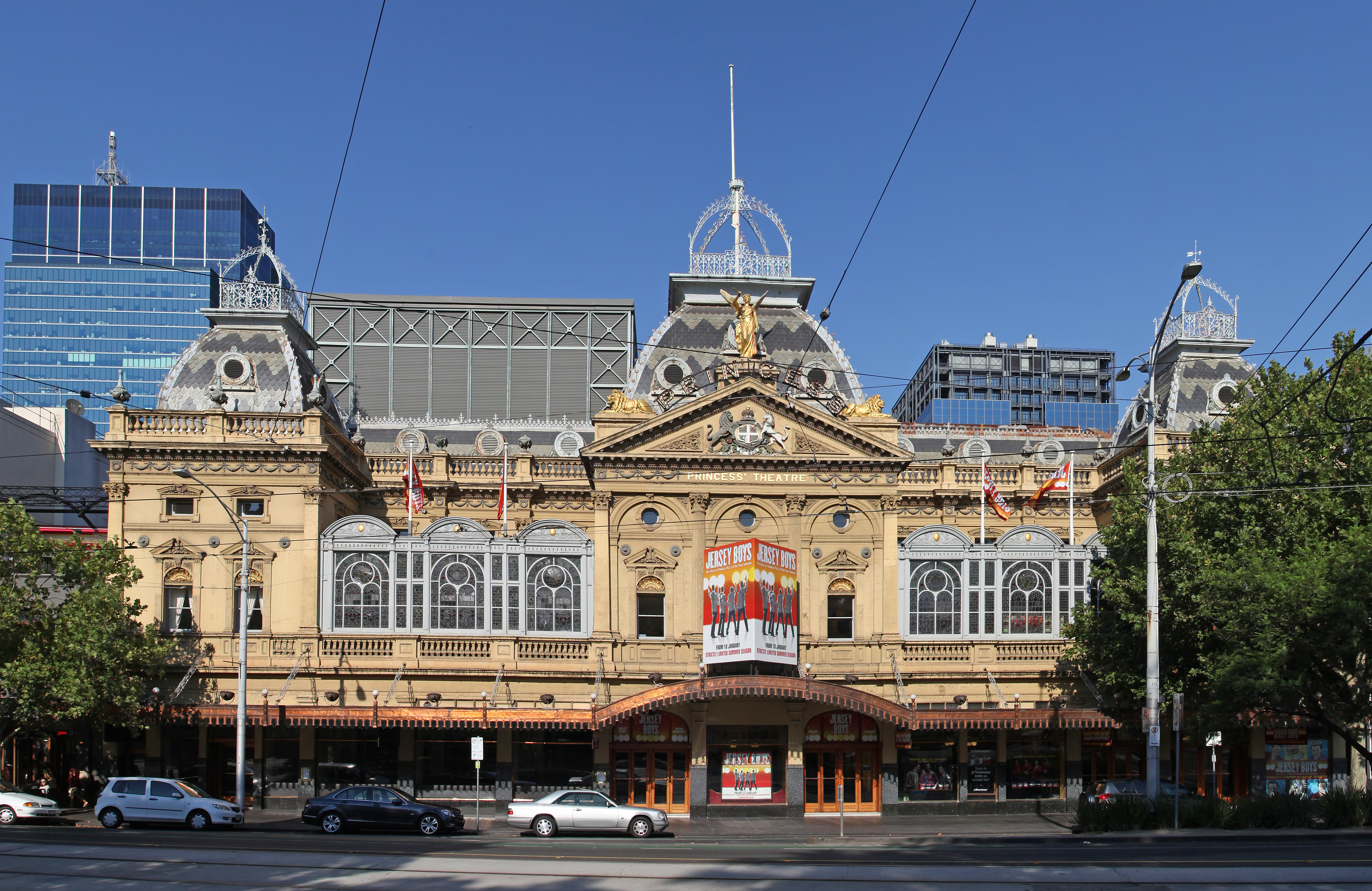
Princess Theatre, Melbourne

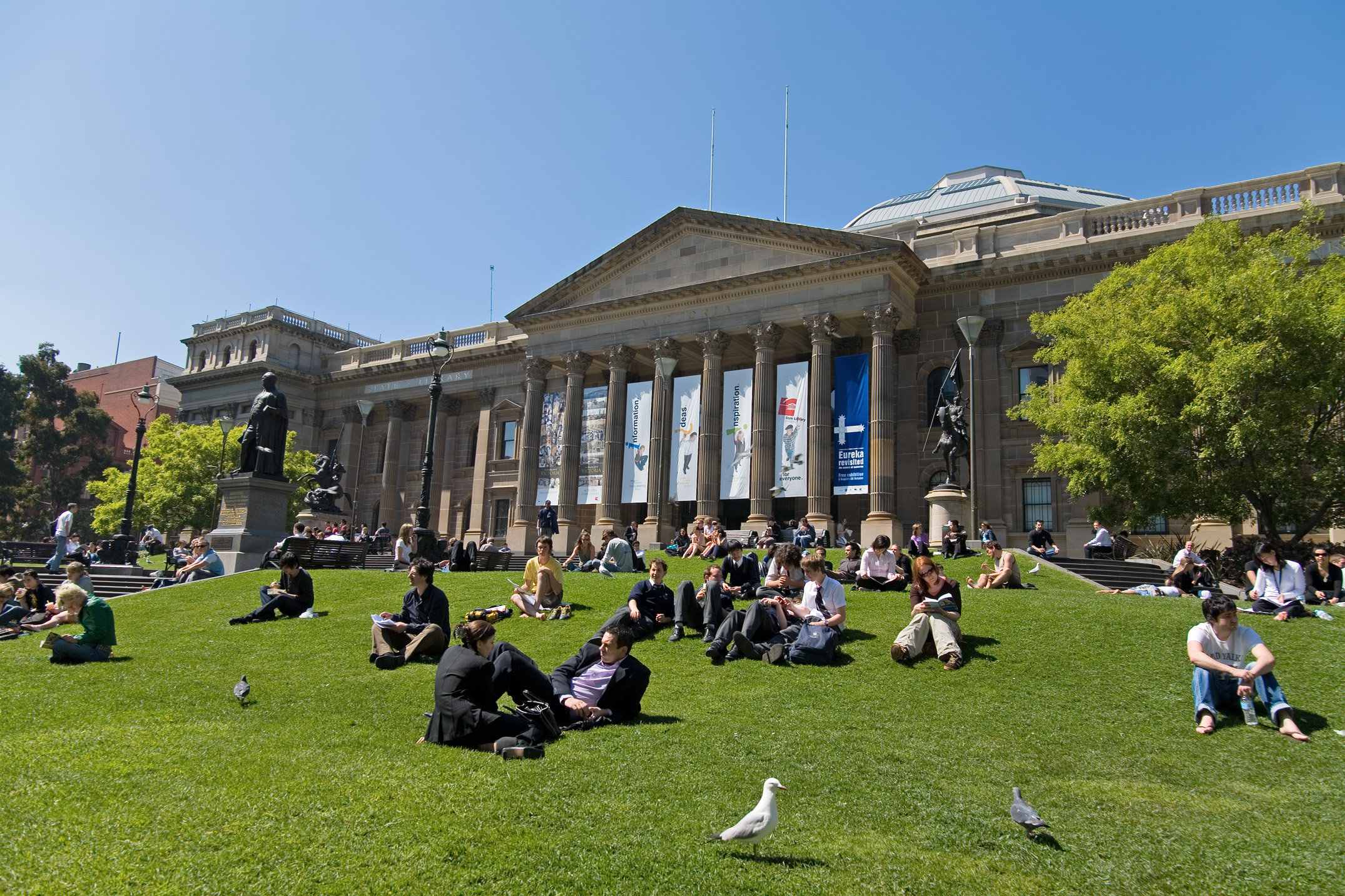
State Library of Victoria of the Academic Classical style (1870)

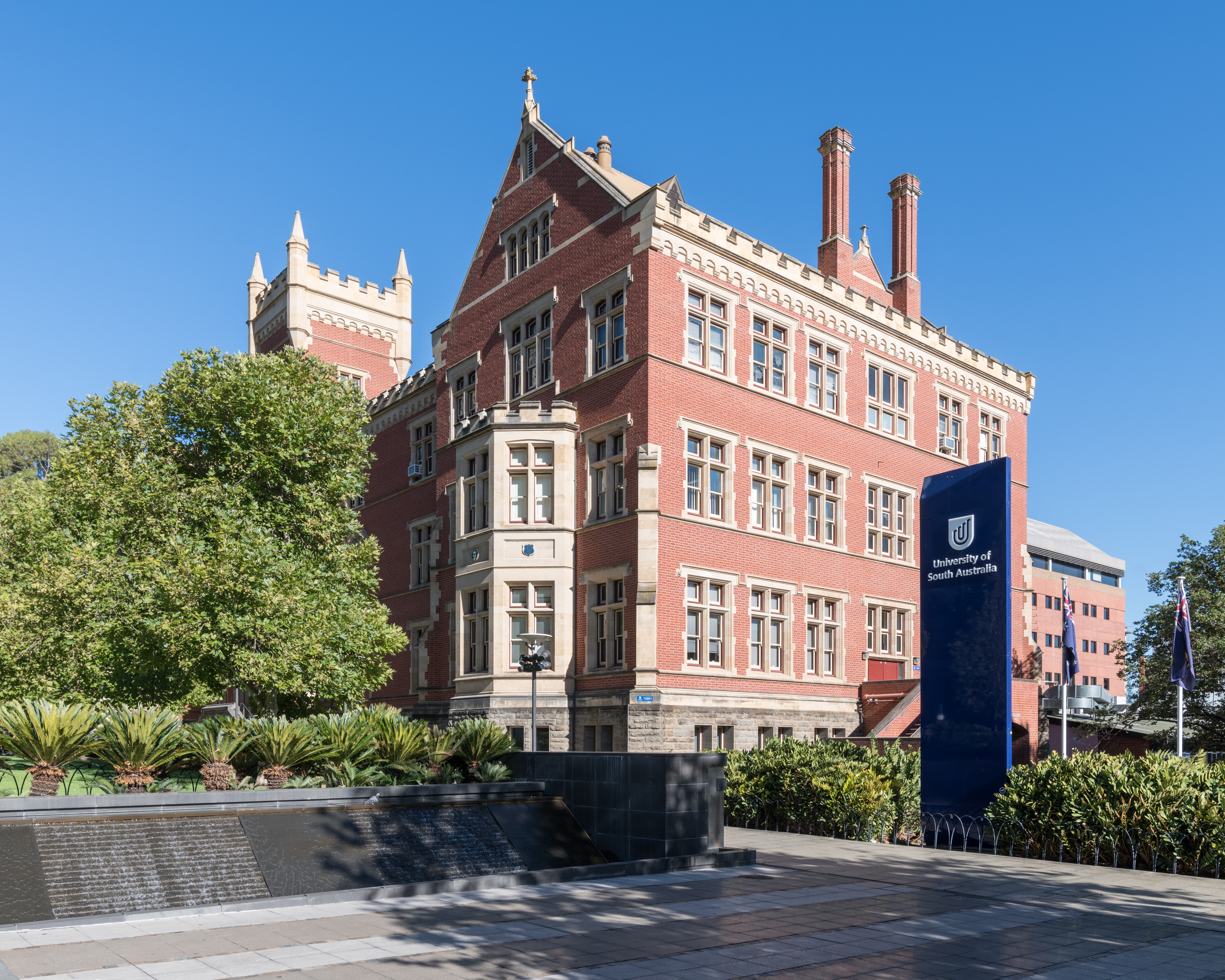
Brookman Hall, UniSA City East Campus, Adelaide, South Australia

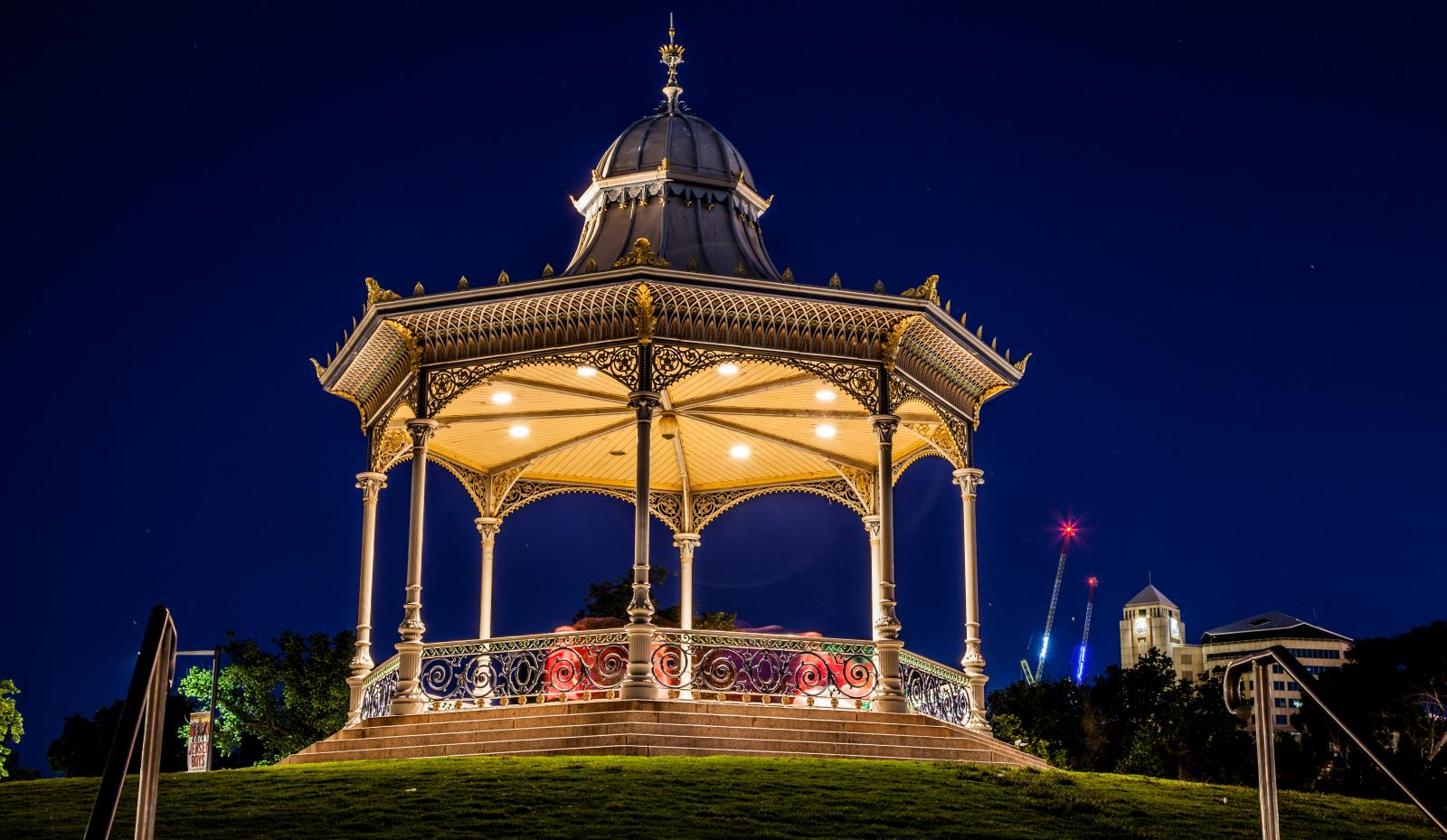
Gazebo in Adelaide, South Australia

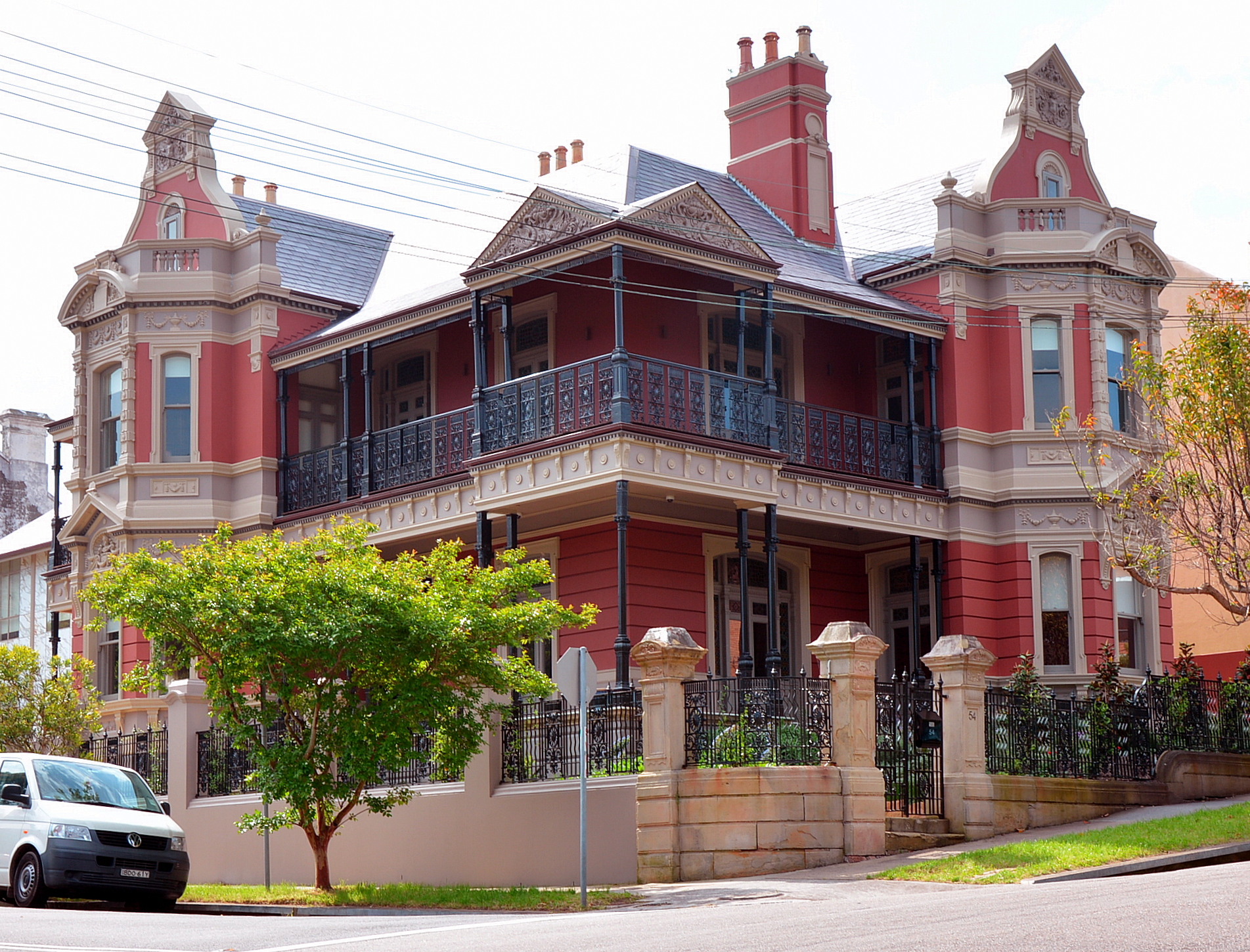
Italianate home in Randwick

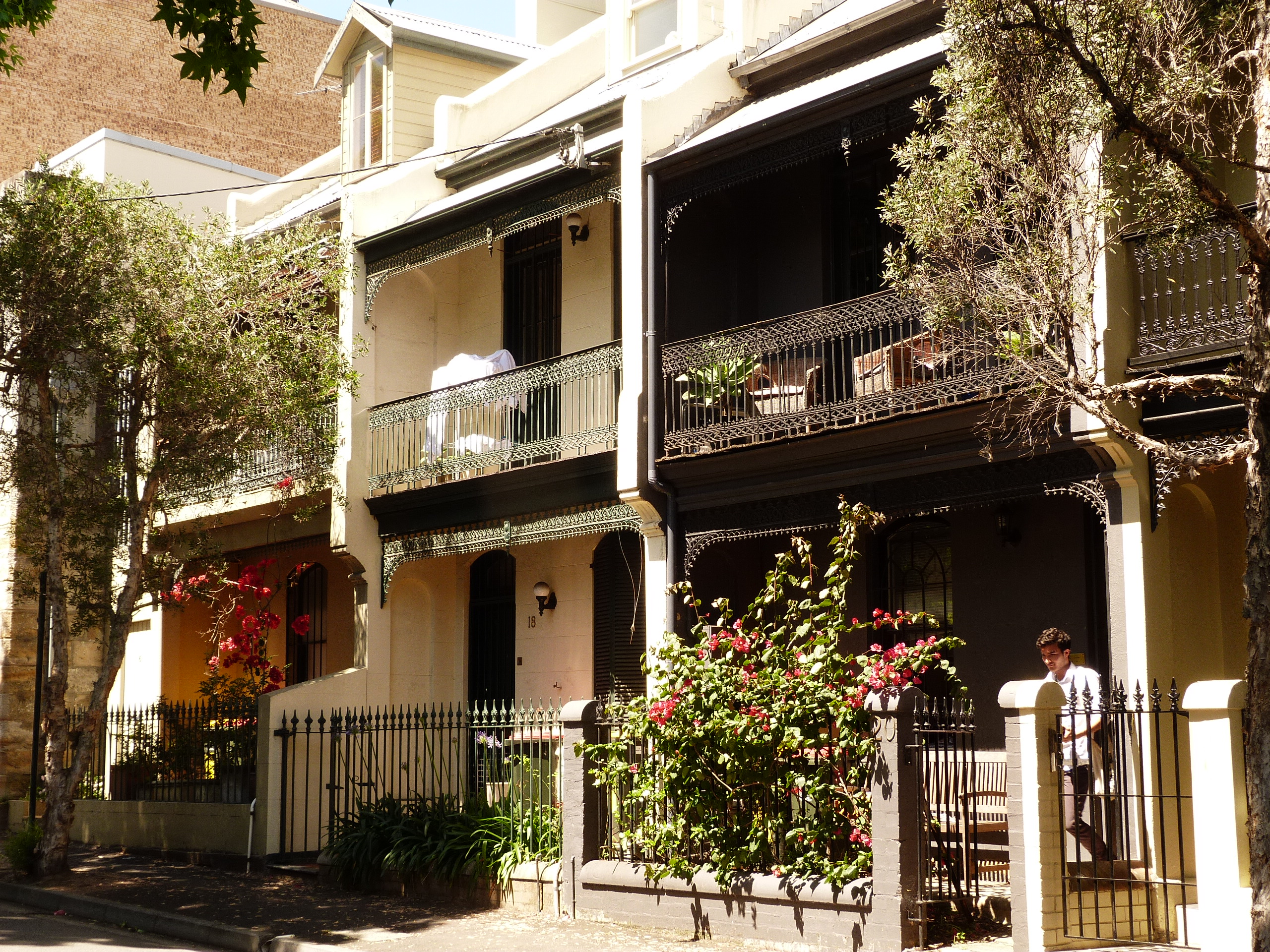
Filigree style terraces in Surry Hills with ornate iron-wrought detailing

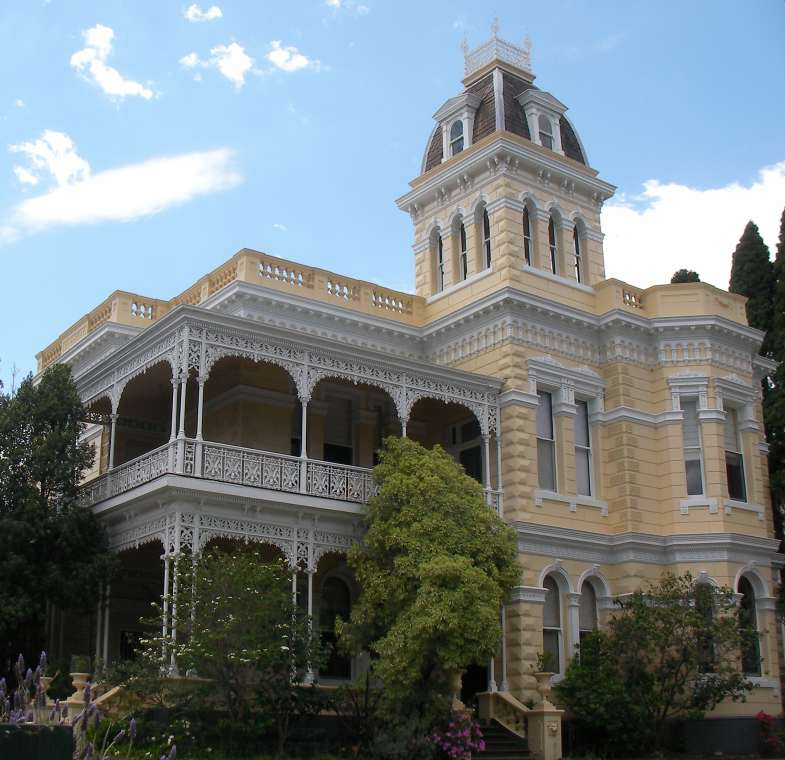
Second Empire and Filigree residence in South Yarra

=== Hong Kong ===
Western influence in architecture was strong when Hong Kong was a British colony. Victorian architecture in Hong Kong:

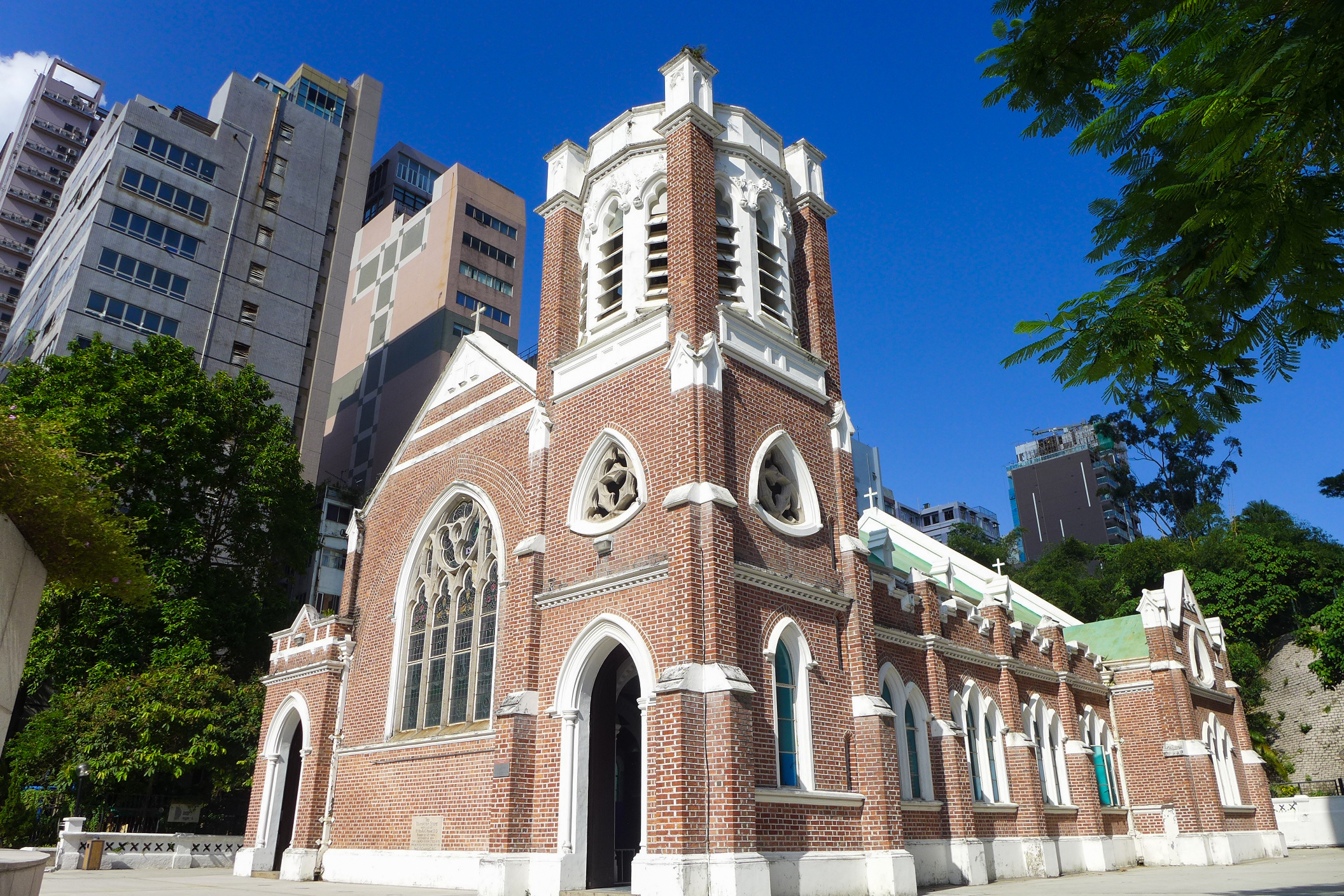
St. Andrew's Church

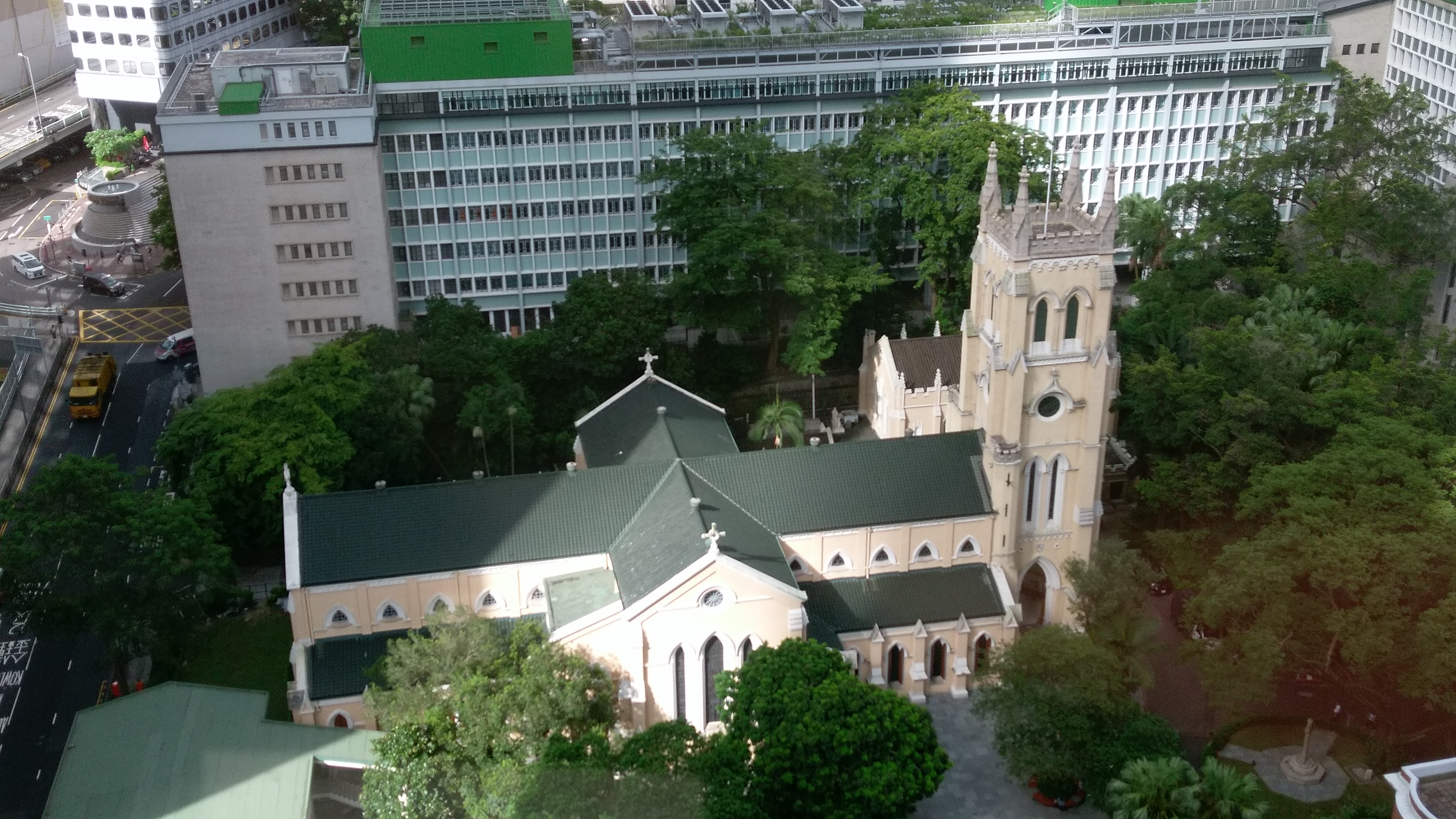
St. John's Cathedral

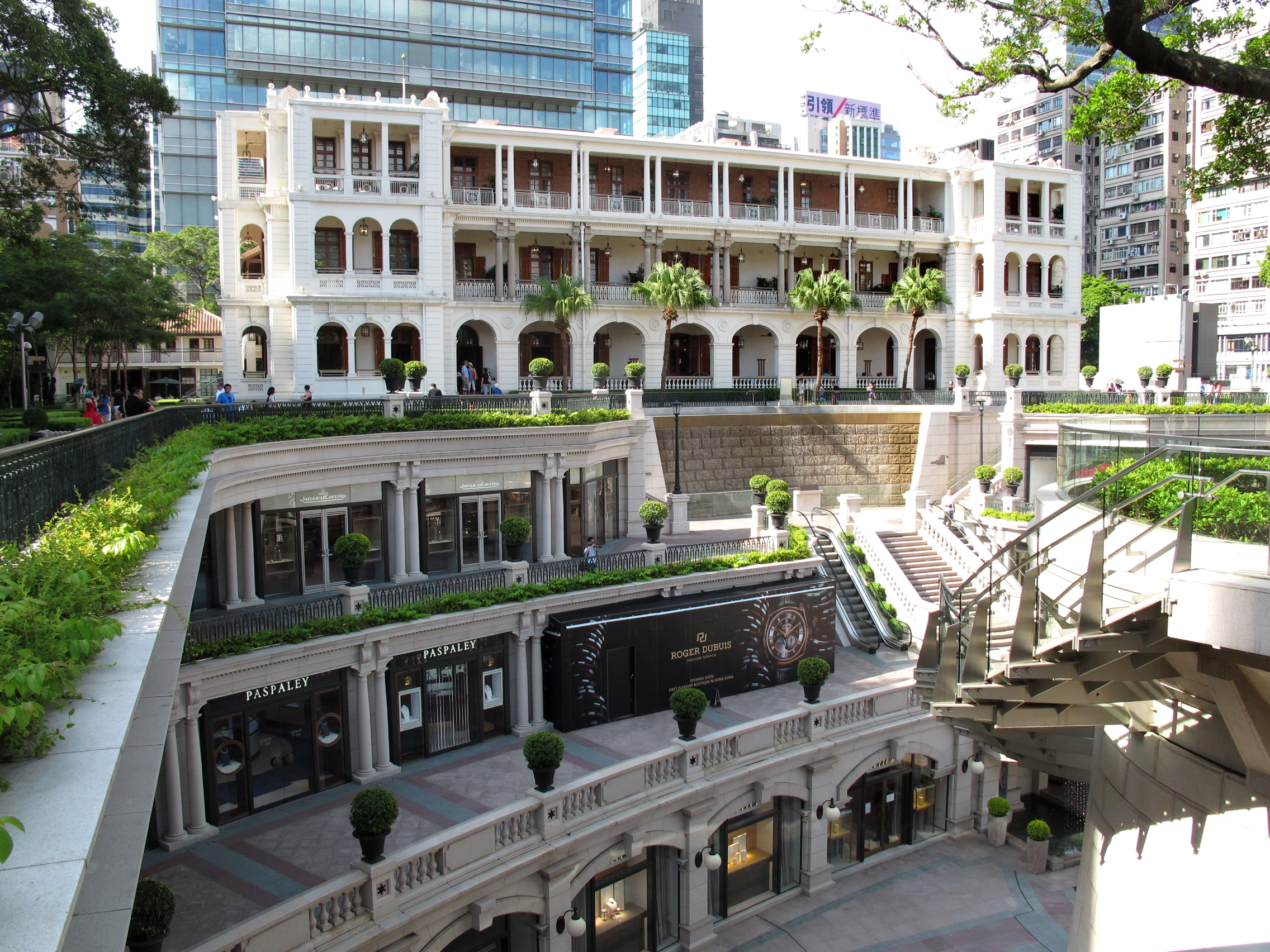
Former Marine Police Headquarters (now officially named as '1881 Heritage', which is a hotel and a shopping mall)

=== Ireland ===
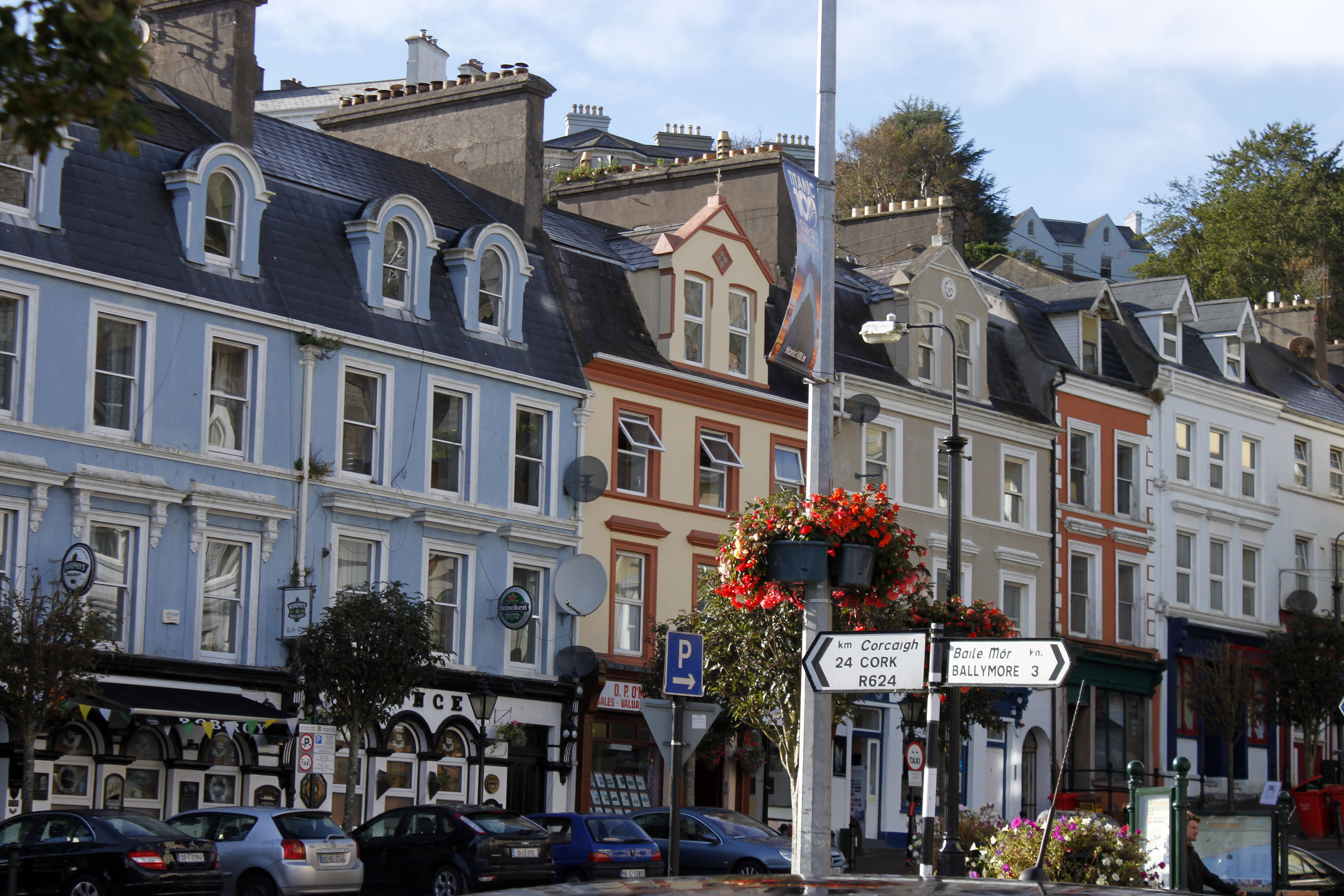
Victorian Queenstown (Cobh)

Georgian architecture is more prominent in Ireland than Victorian architecture. The cities of Dublin, Limerick, and Cork are famously dominated by Georgian squares and terraces. However, Victorian architecture flourished in certain quarters, particularly around Dublin's Wicklow Street and Upper Baggot Street, and in the suburbs of Phibsborough, Glasnevin, Rathmines, Ranelagh, Rathgar, Rathfarnham, and Terenure. The colourful Italianate buildings of Cobh are excellent examples of the regional Victorian style in Ireland. Further examples of Victorian architecture in the country include Dublin's George's Street Arcade, the Royal City of Dublin Hospital on Baggot Street and the Royal Victoria Eye and Ear Hospital on Adelaide Road.

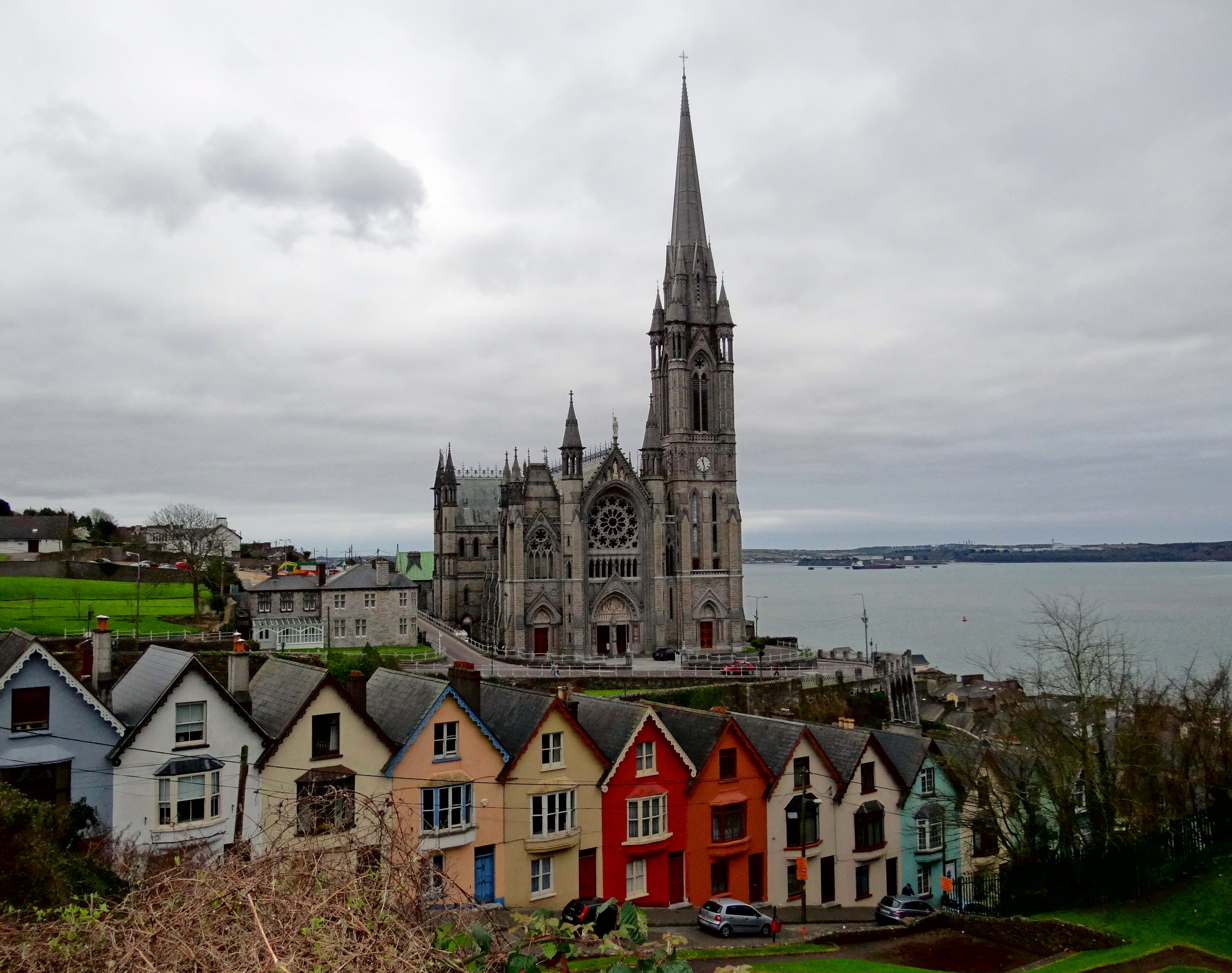
A Victorian terrace in Cobh known as the "deck of cards"

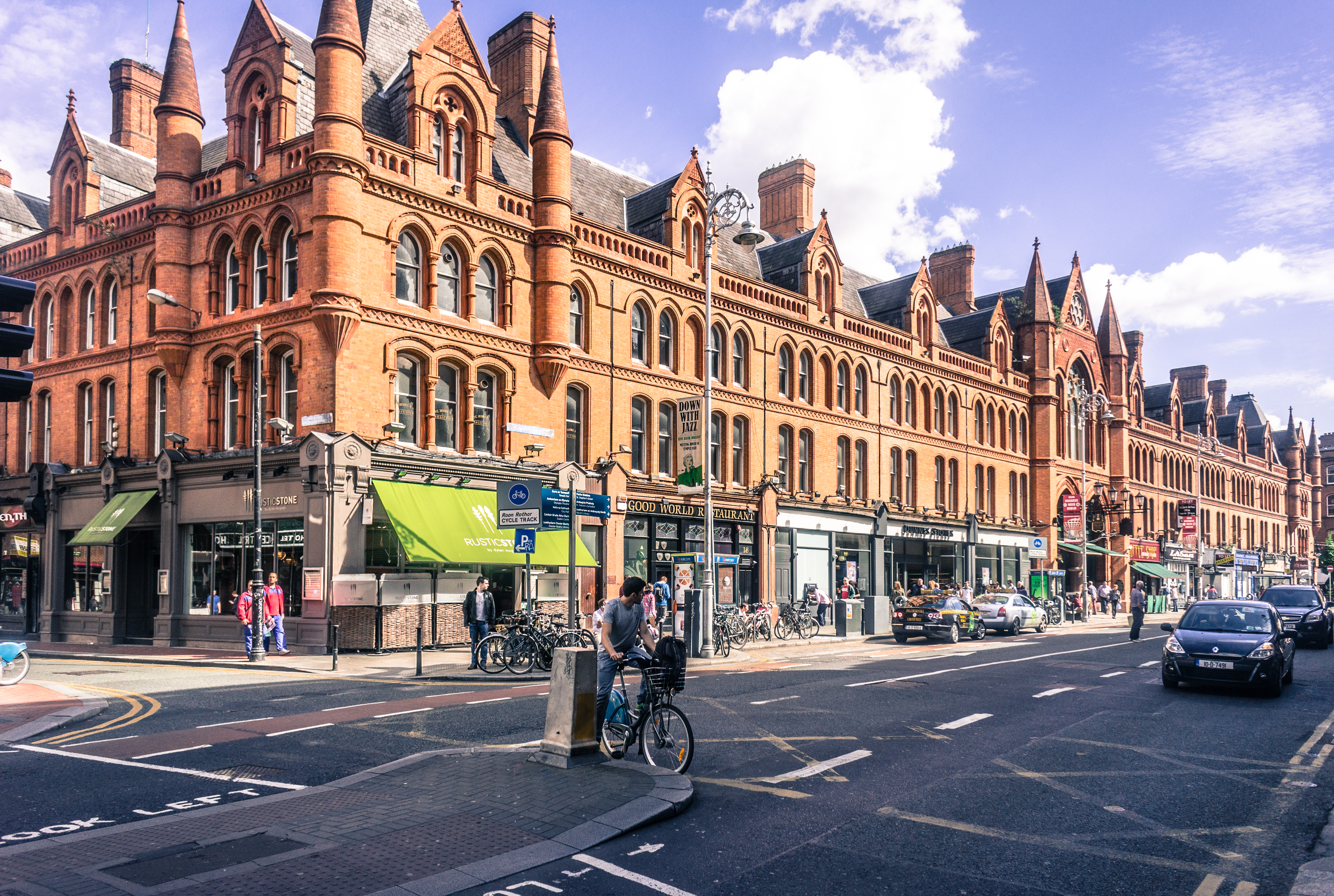
Victorian shops and cafes, including the George's Street Arcade, Dublin D02

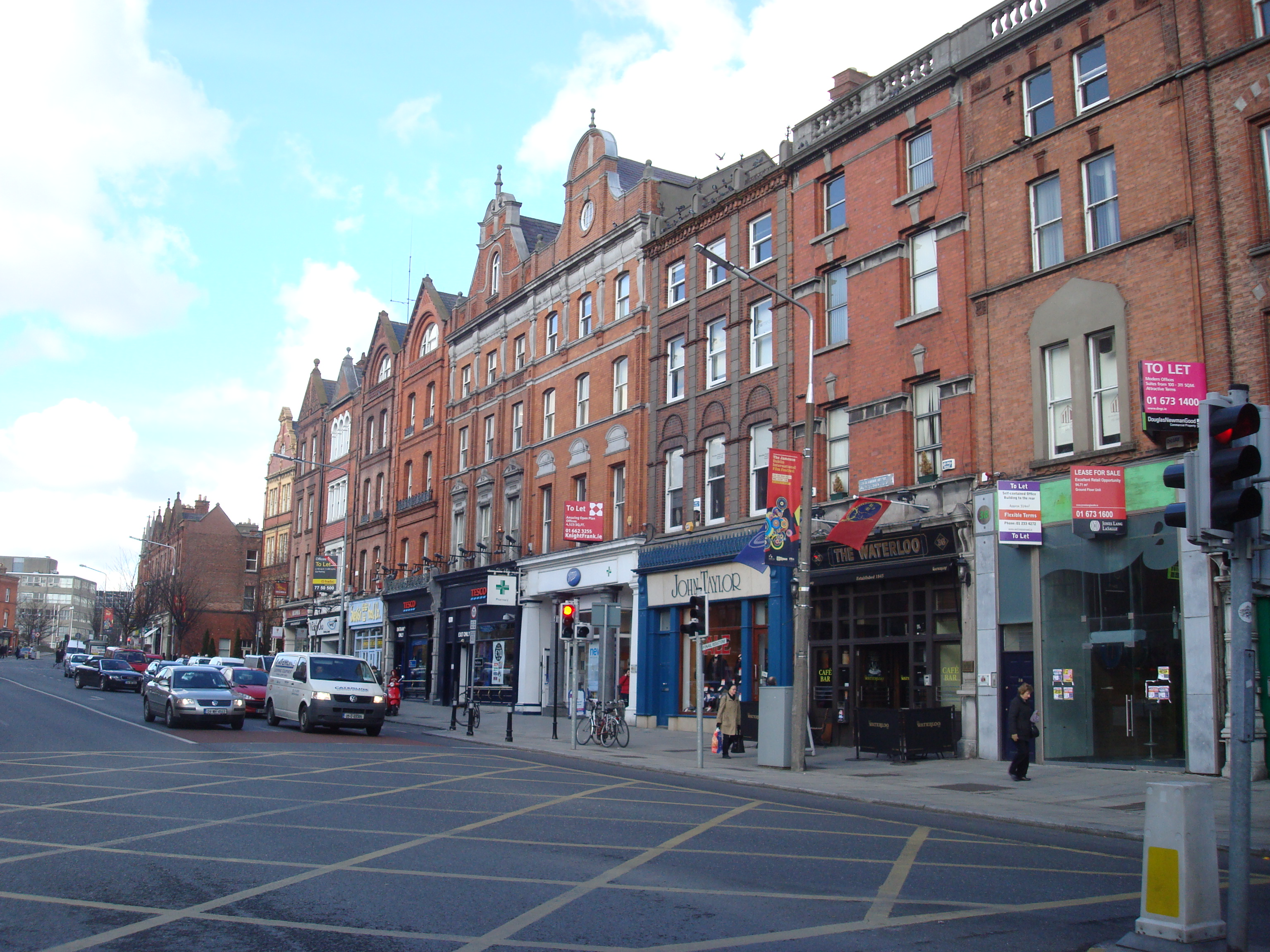
Victorian Upper Baggot Street, Dublin D02

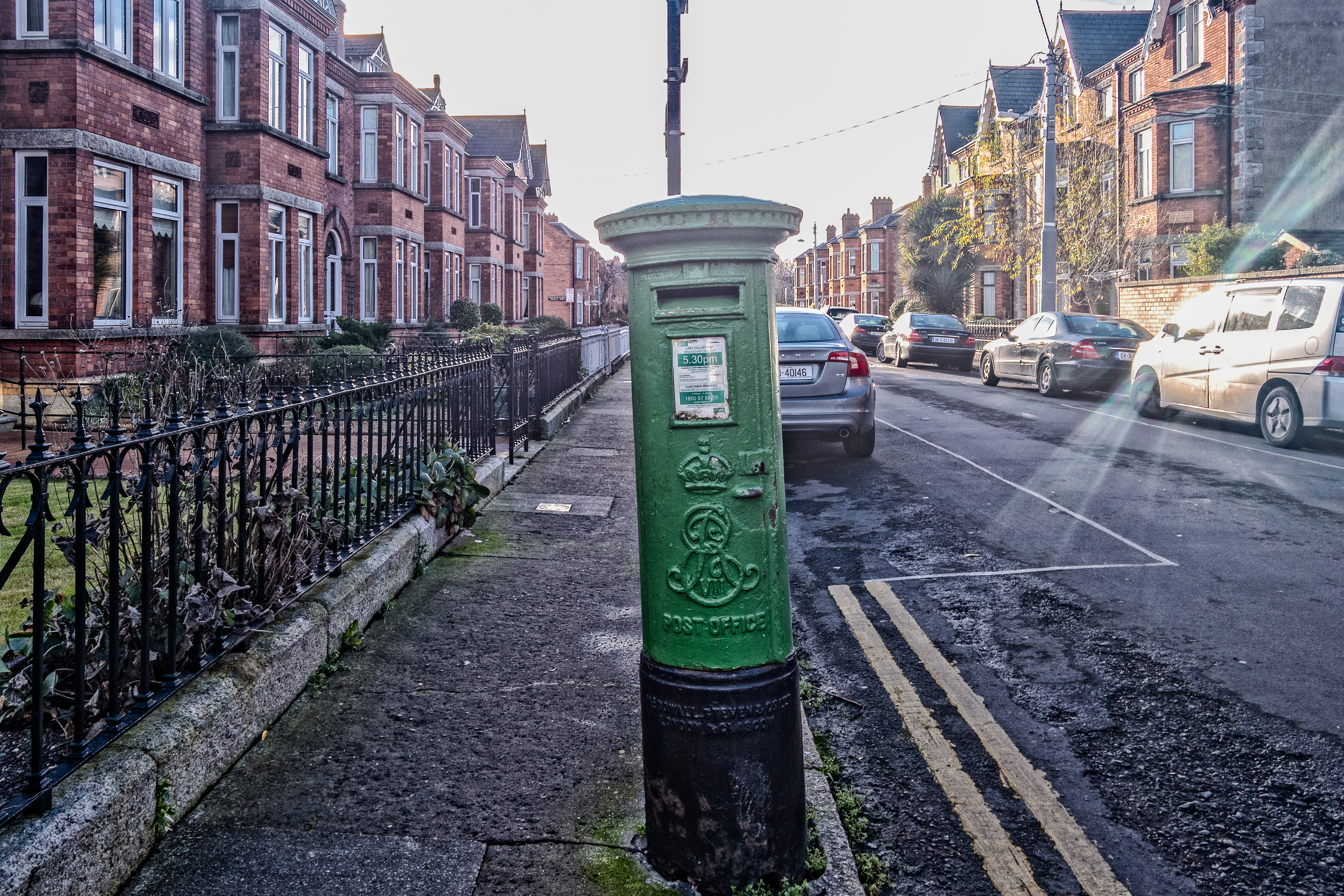
Victorian terraced houses in Dublin D6W

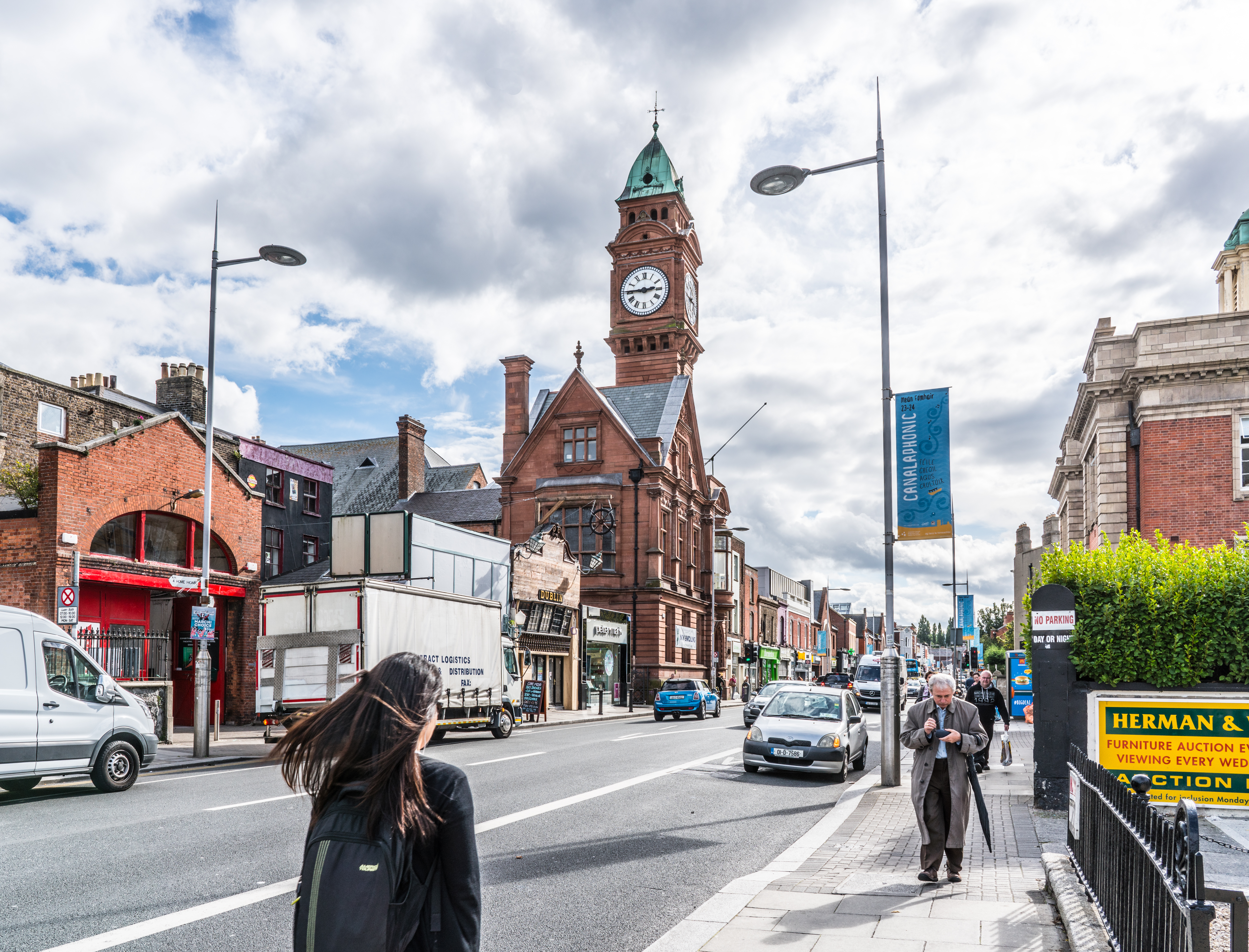
Rathmines Clock Tower, Rathmines, Dublin D06

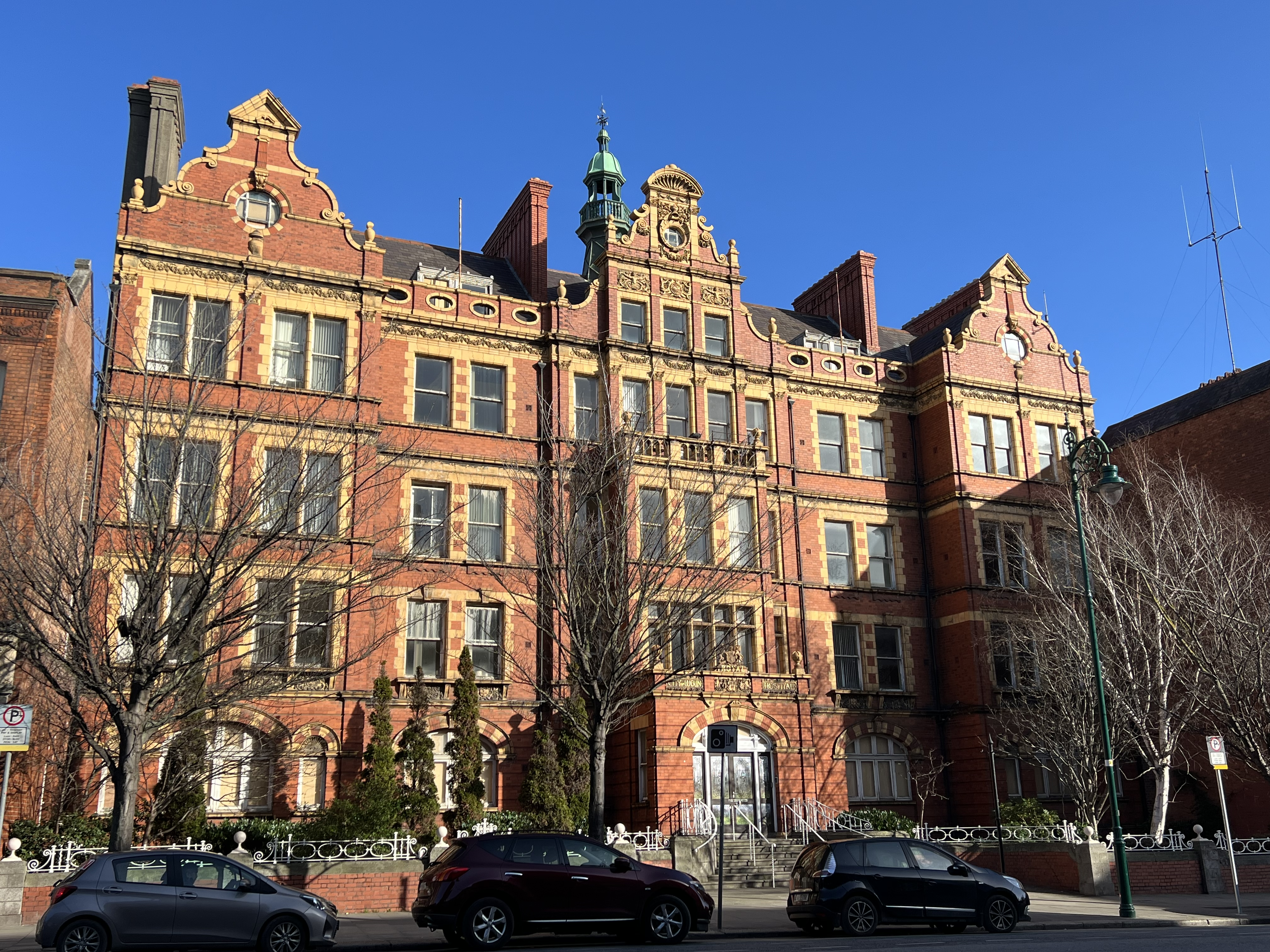
The Royal City of Dublin Hospital, Dublin D04

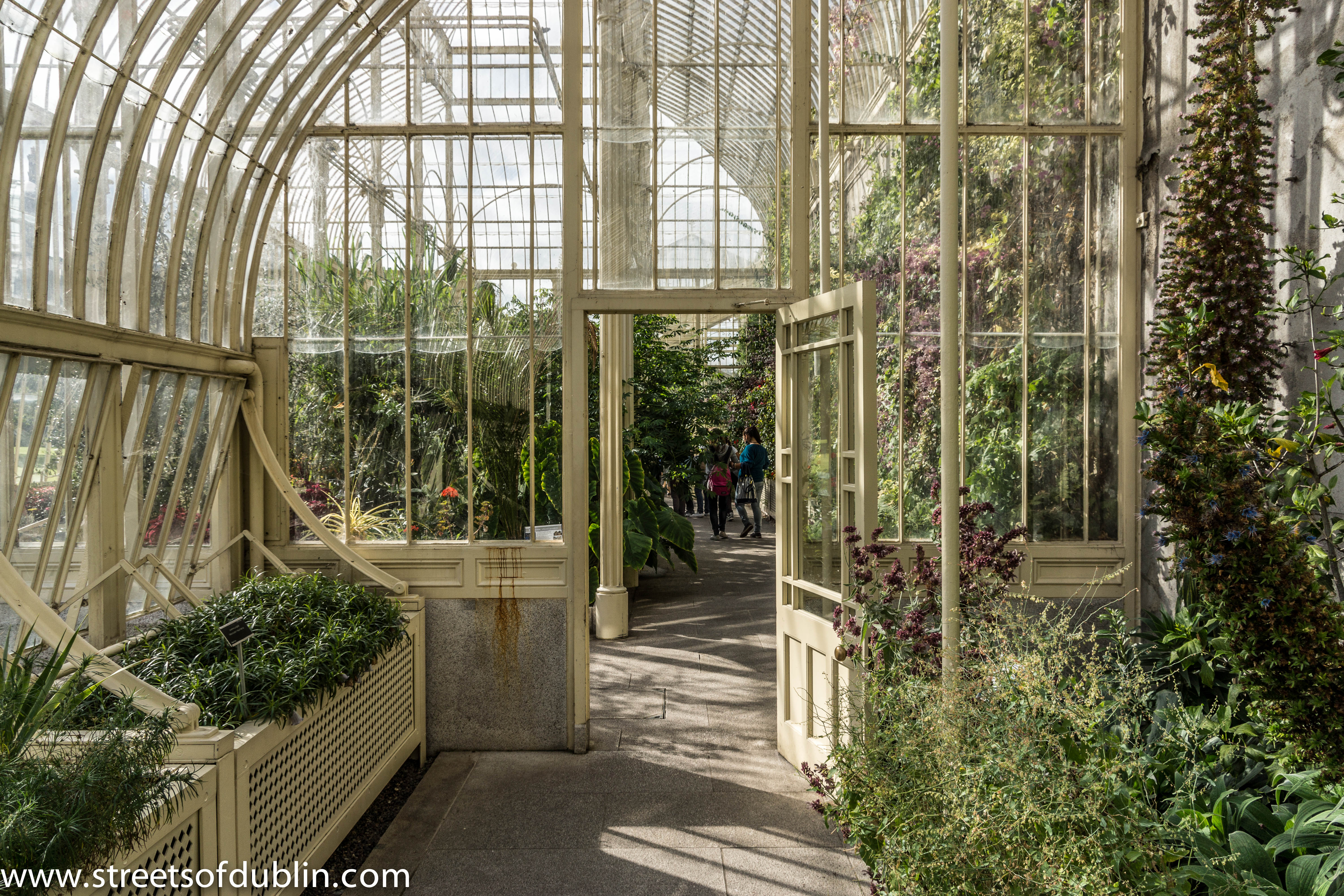
National Botanic Gardens glasshouse, Glasnevin, Dublin D09

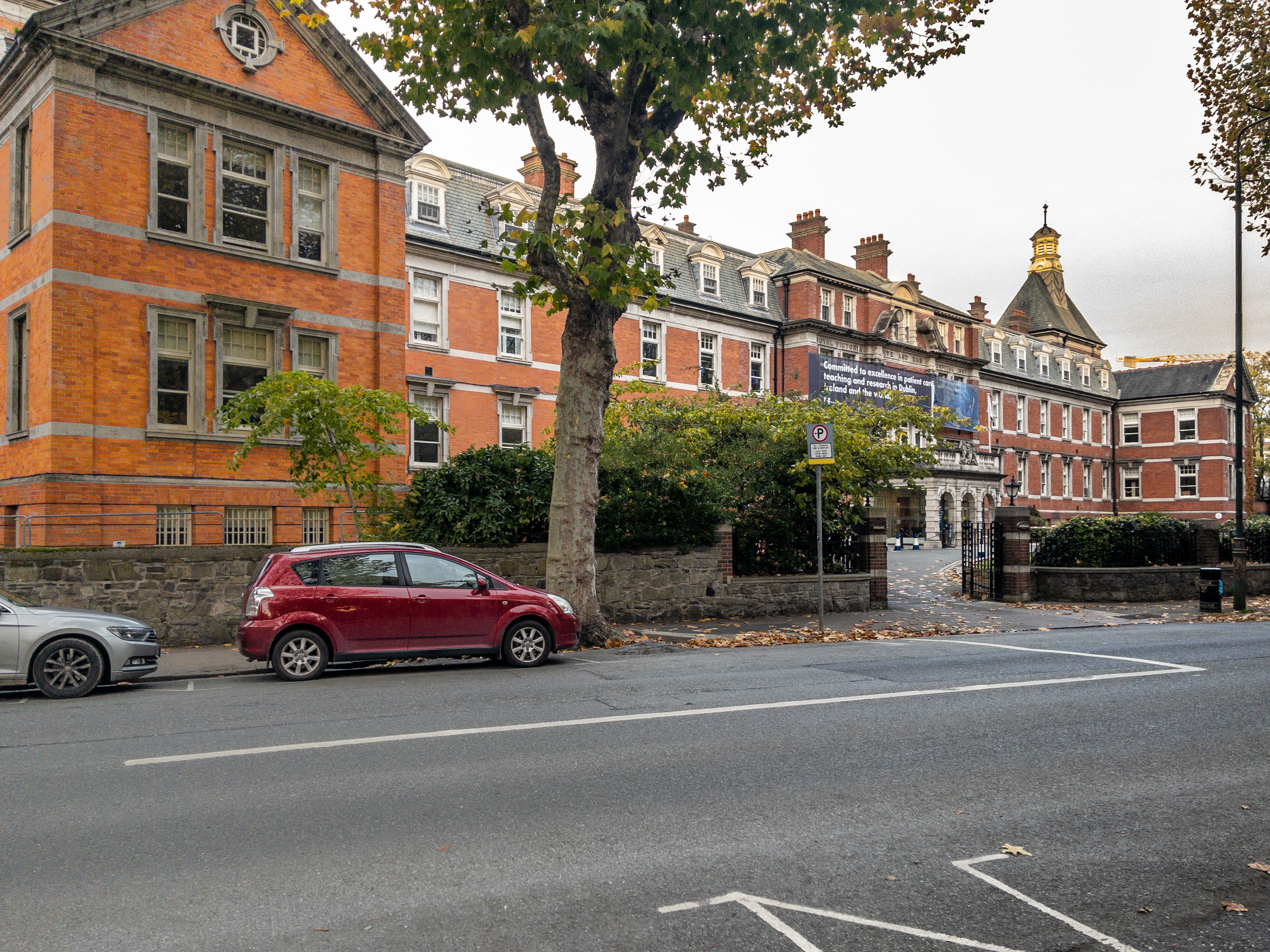
The Royal Victoria Eye and Ear Hospital, Adelaide Road, Dublin D02

=== Sri Lanka ===
During the British colonial period of British Ceylon: Sri Lanka Law College, Sri Lanka College of Technology, Galle Face Hotel and the Royal College Main Building.

=== North America ===
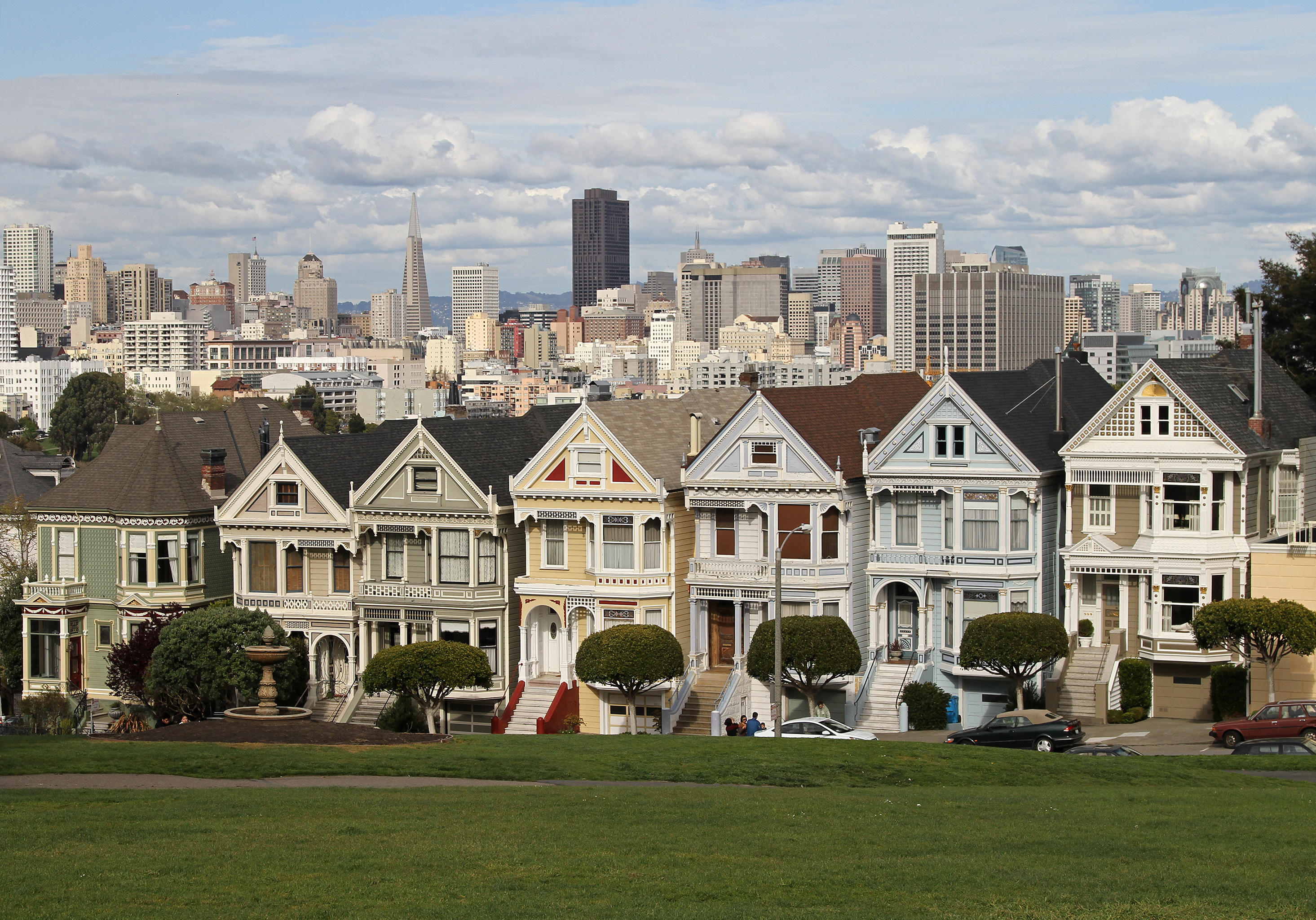
The Painted Ladies are an example of Victorian architecture found in San Francisco, California.

In the United States, 'Victorian' architecture generally describes styles that were most popular between 1860 and 1900. A list of these styles most commonly includes Second Empire (1855–85), Stick-Eastlake (1860–c. 1890), Folk Victorian (1870–1910), Queen Anne (1880–1910), Richardsonian Romanesque (1880–1900), and Shingle (1880–1900). As in the United Kingdom, examples of Gothic Revival and Italianate continued to be constructed during this period and are therefore sometimes called Victorian. Some historians classify the later years of Gothic Revival as a distinctive Victorian style named High Victorian Gothic. Stick-Eastlake, a manner of geometric, machine-cut decorating derived from Stick and Queen Anne, is sometimes considered a distinct style. On the other hand, terms such as "Painted Ladies" or "gingerbread" may be used to describe certain Victorian buildings, but do not constitute a specific style. The names of architectural styles (as well as their adaptations) varied between countries. Many homes combined the elements of several different styles and are not easily distinguishable as one particular style or another.

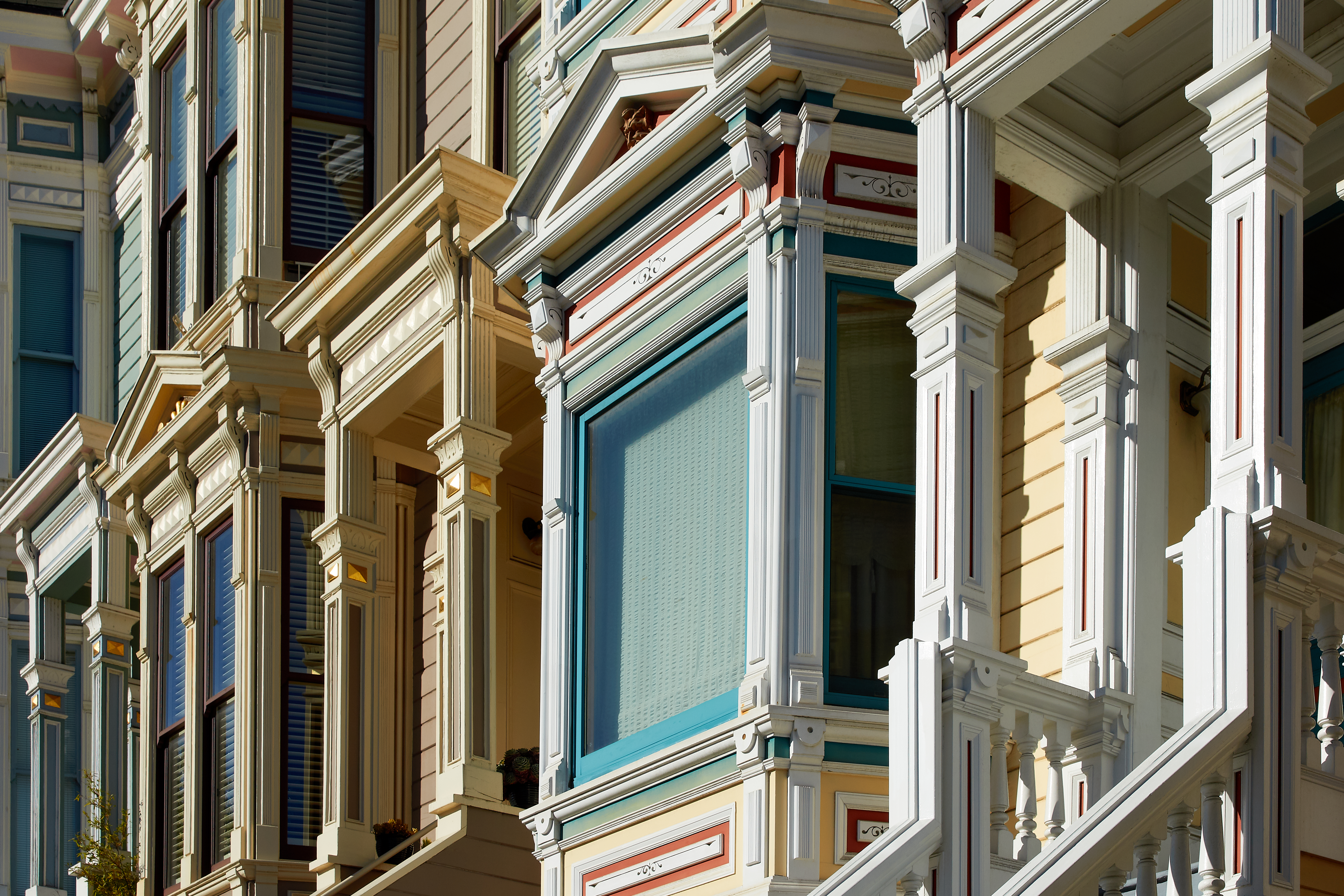
Victorian facades on 16th Street, San Francisco

Notable Victorian-inspired cities during this era include, Astoria in Oregon; Philadelphia and Pittsburgh in Pennsylvania; Washington, D.C.; Boston in Massachusetts; Alameda, Eureka, San Francisco, and Midtown Sacramento in California; The Brooklyn Heights, Forrest Hills, Park Slope, St. George, and Victorian Flatbush sections of New York City, Garden City, Oyster Bay, and Roslyn on Long Island, and Albany, Troy, Buffalo, and Rochester in Upstate New York; Asbury Park / Ocean Grove, Cape May, Deal, Flemington, Freehold, Hackettstown, Jersey City / Hoboken, Madison, Metuchen, Montclair, Ridgewood, Plainfield, Summit, and Westfield in New Jersey; Chicago, Galena, and Winnetka in Illinois; Detroit and Grand Rapids in Michigan; Cincinnati and Columbus in Ohio; Galveston in Texas; Baltimore in Maryland; Louisville in Kentucky; Atlanta in Georgia; Milwaukee in Wisconsin; New Orleans in Louisiana; Richmond in Virginia; St. Louis in Missouri; and Saint Paul in Minnesota. Los Angeles grew from a Pueblo (village) into a Victorian Downtown – now almost entirely demolished but with residential remnants in its Angelino Heights and Westlake neighborhoods. San Francisco is particularly well known for its extensive Victorian architecture, especially in the Haight-Ashbury, Lower Haight, Alamo Square, Western Addition, Mission, Duboce Triangle, Noe Valley, Castro, Nob Hill, and Pacific Heights neighborhoods.

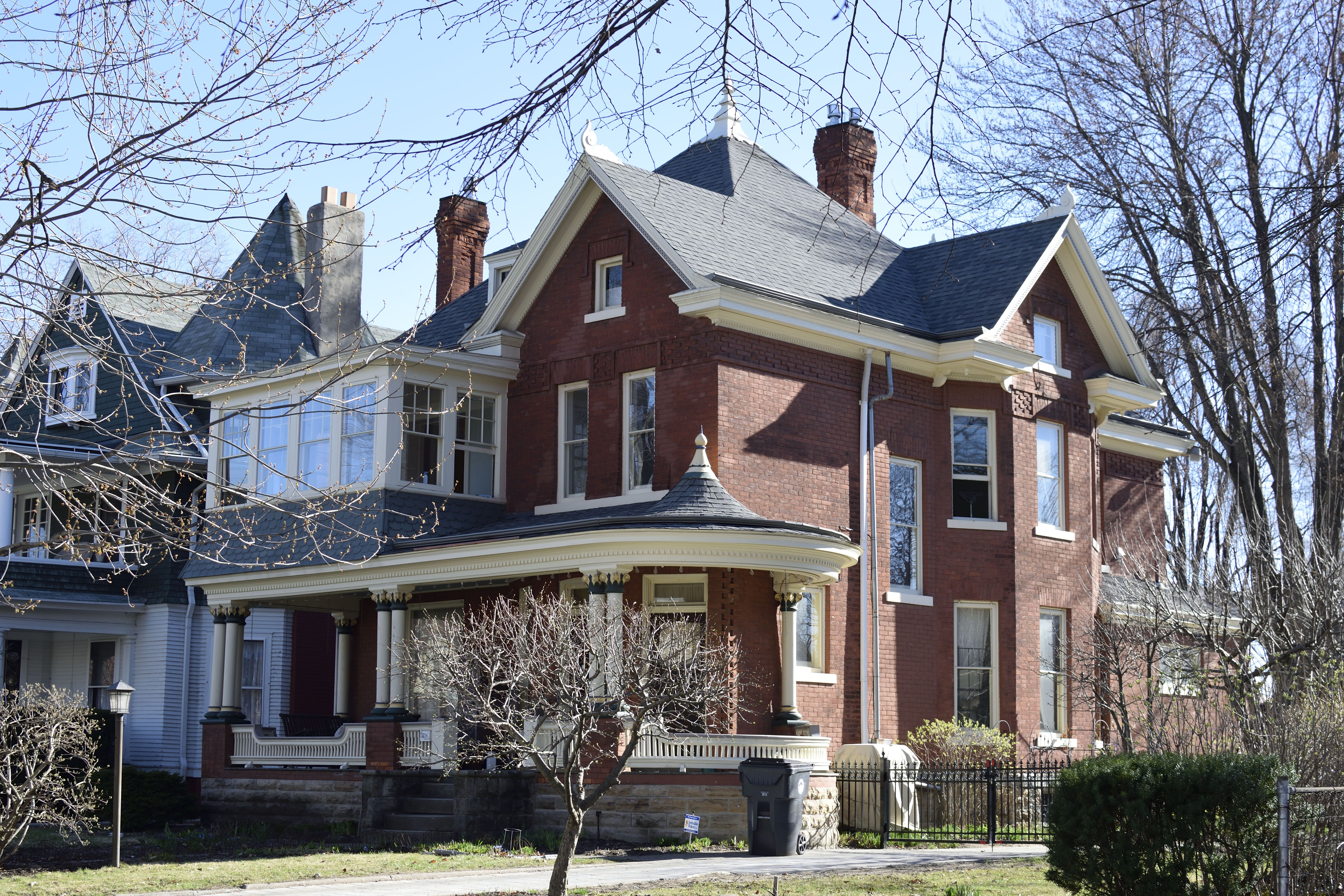
An example of residential architecture in the Old West End District (Toledo, Ohio), a well preserved historic district full of Victorian architecture

The extent to which any one is the "largest surviving example" is debated, with numerous qualifications. The Distillery District in Toronto, Ontario contains the largest and best-preserved collection of Victorian-era industrial architecture in North America. Cabbagetown is the largest and most continuous Victorian residential area in North America. Other Toronto Victorian neighbourhoods include The Annex, Parkdale, and Rosedale. In the US, the South End of Boston is recognized by the National Register of Historic Places as the oldest and largest Victorian neighborhood in the country. Old Louisville in Louisville, Kentucky, also claims to be the nation's largest Victorian neighborhood. Richmond, Virginia is home to several large Victorian neighborhoods, the most prominent being The Fan. The Fan district is best known locally as Richmond's largest and most 'European' of Richmond's neighborhoods and nationally as the largest contiguous Victorian neighborhood in the United States. The Old West End neighborhood of Toledo, Ohio is recognized as the largest collection of late Victorian and Edwardian homes in the United States, east of the Mississippi. Summit Avenue in Saint Paul, Minnesota, has the longest line of Victorian homes in the country. Over-The-Rhine in Cincinnati, Ohio, has the largest collection of early Victorian Italianate architecture in the United States, and is an example of an intact 19th-century urban neighborhood. According to National Register of Historic Places, Cape May Historic District has one of the largest collections of late 19th century frame buildings left in the United States.

The photo album L'Architecture Americaine by Albert Levy published in 1886 is perhaps the first recognition in Europe of the new forces emerging in North American architecture.

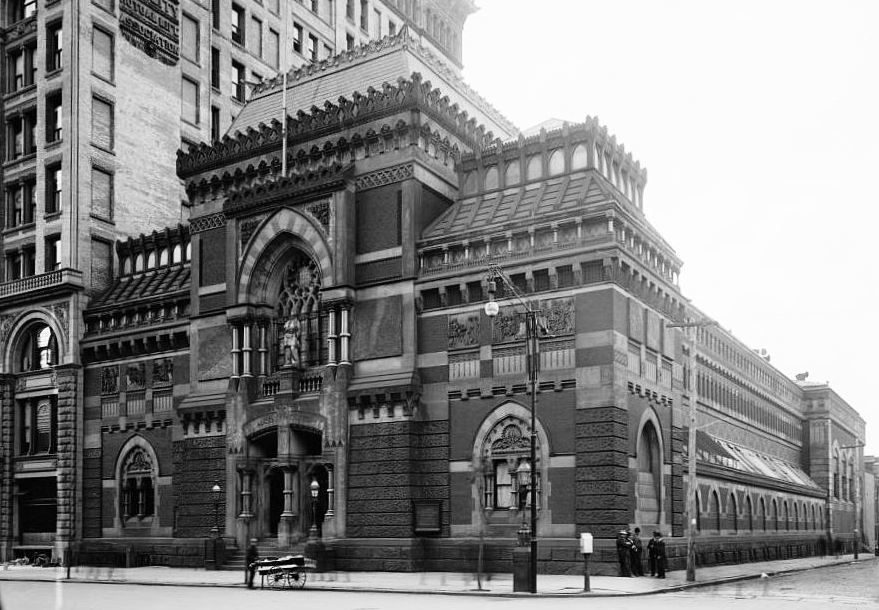
Pennsylvania Academy of Fine Arts, Philadelphia, by Frank Furness

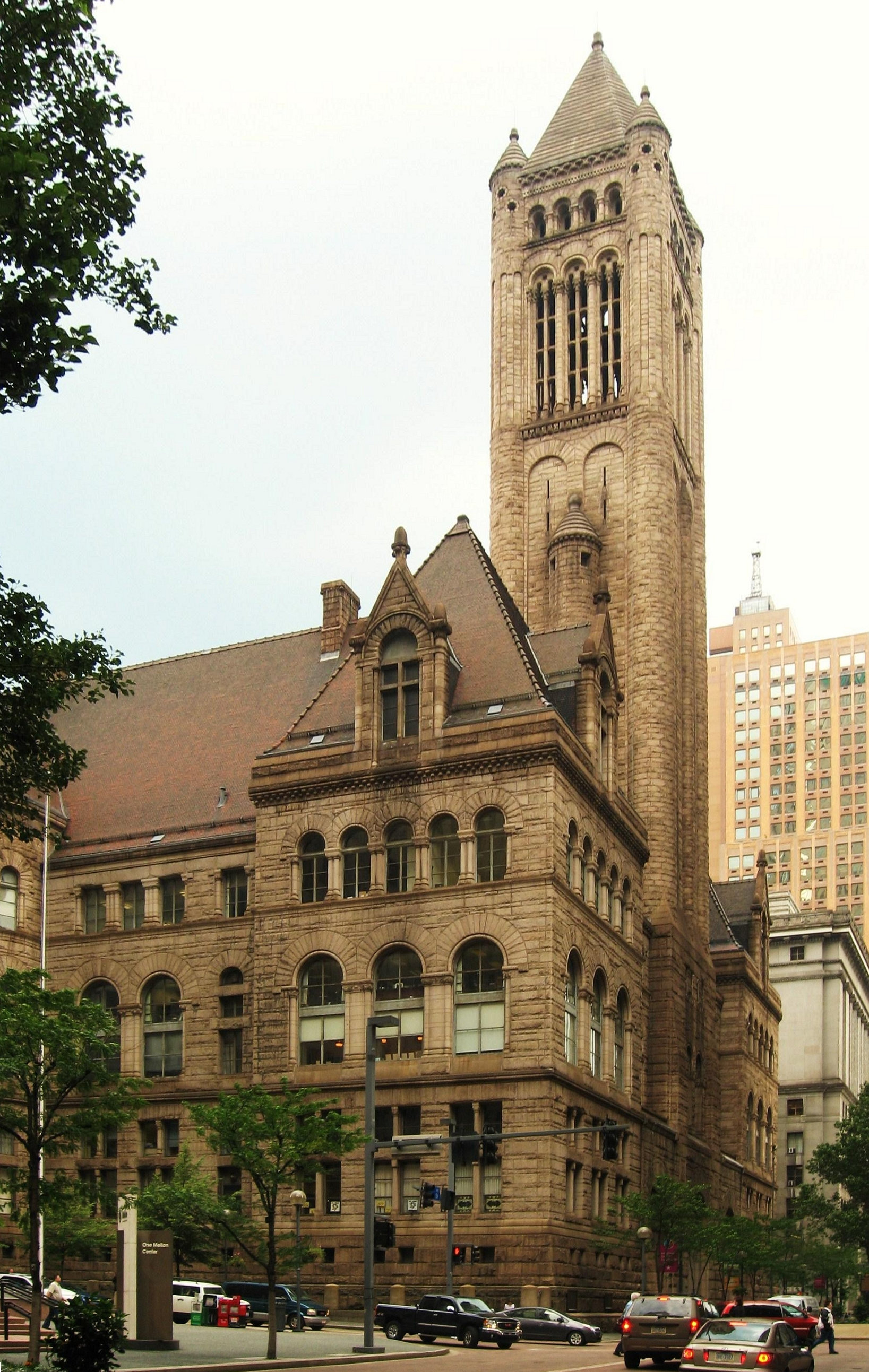
Allegheny County Courthouse, Pittsburgh, Pennsylvania, by Henry Hobson Richardson

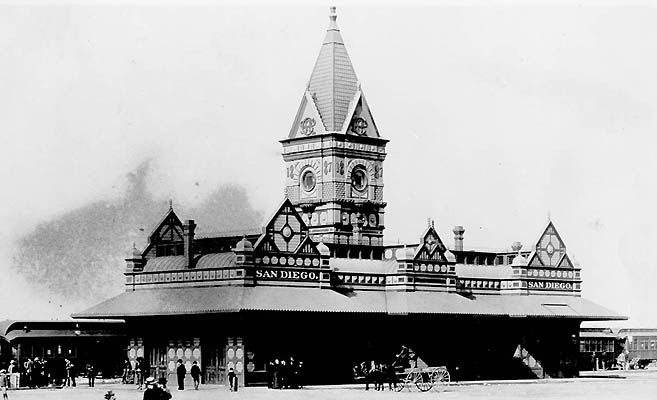
The California Southern Railroad's San Diego passenger terminal, built in 1887

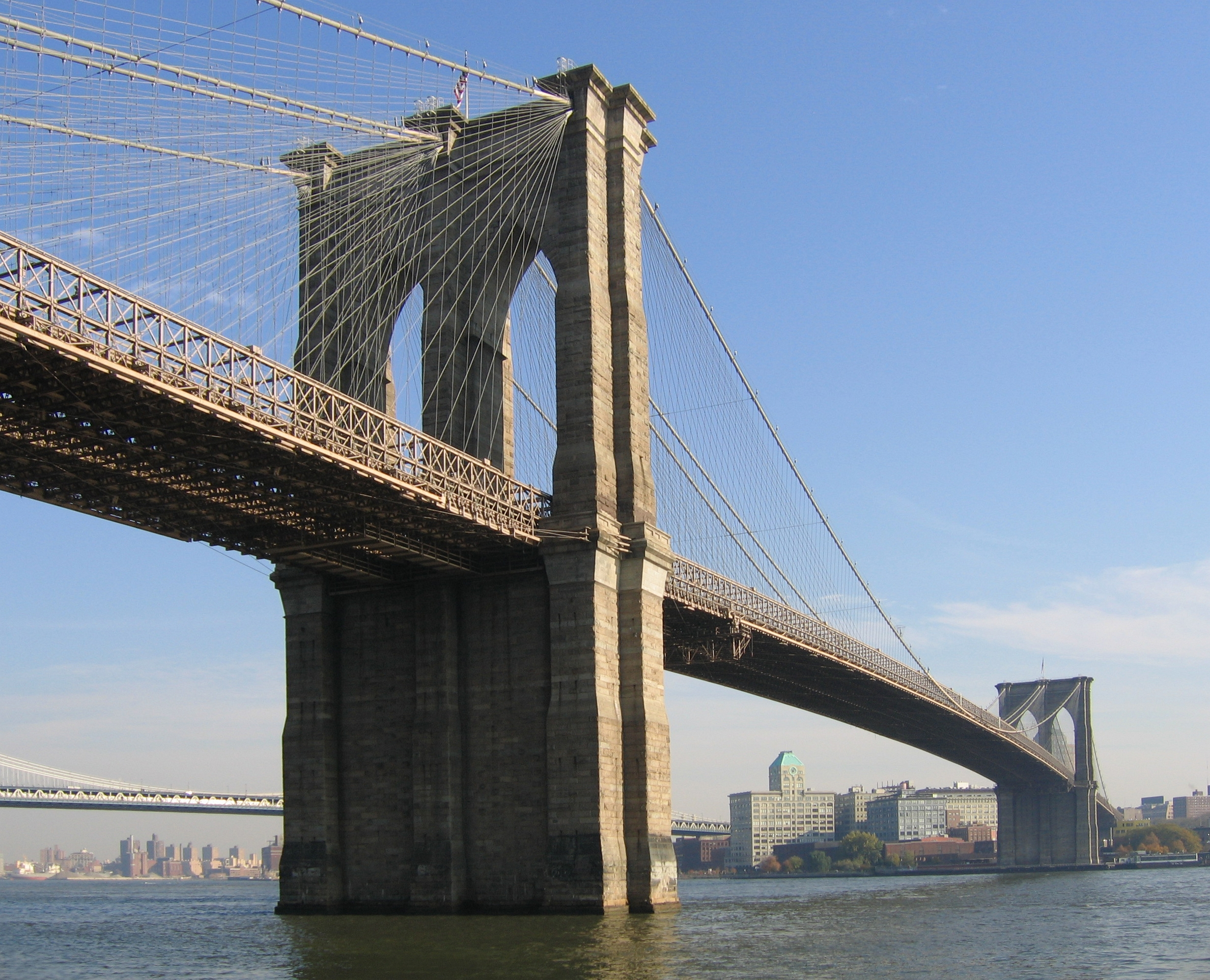
Brooklyn Bridge, 1883, New York City

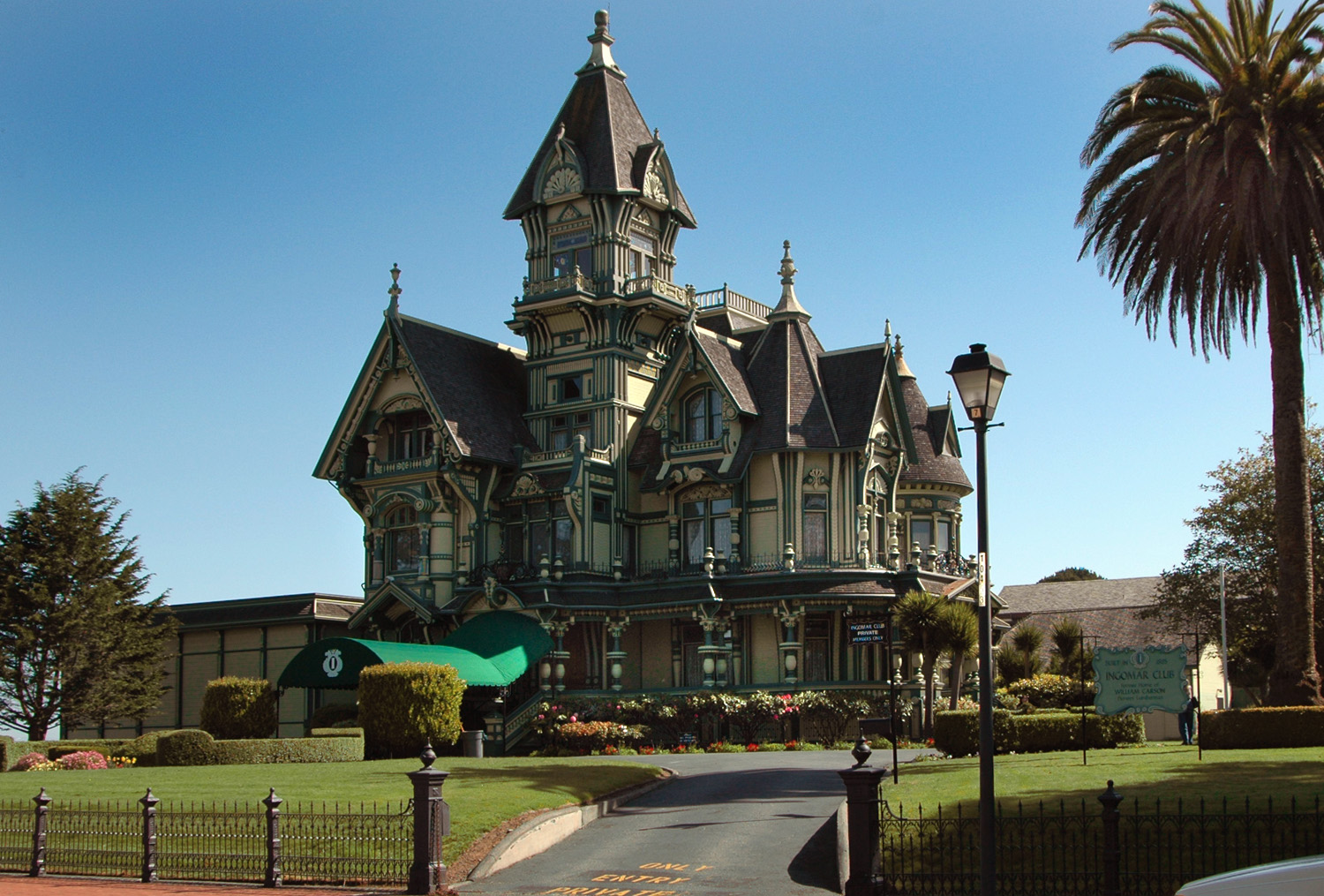
The Carson Mansion in Eureka, California, widely considered one of the highest executions of Queen Anne style, built 1884–86

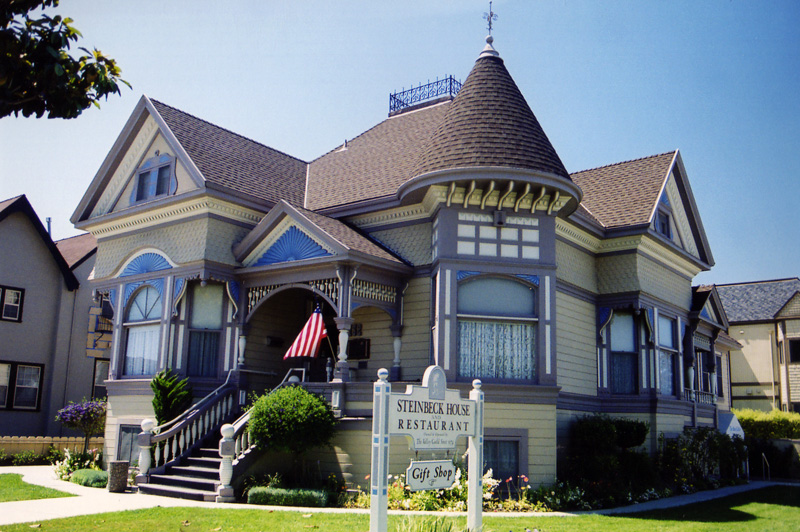
John Steinbeck's childhood home in Salinas, California

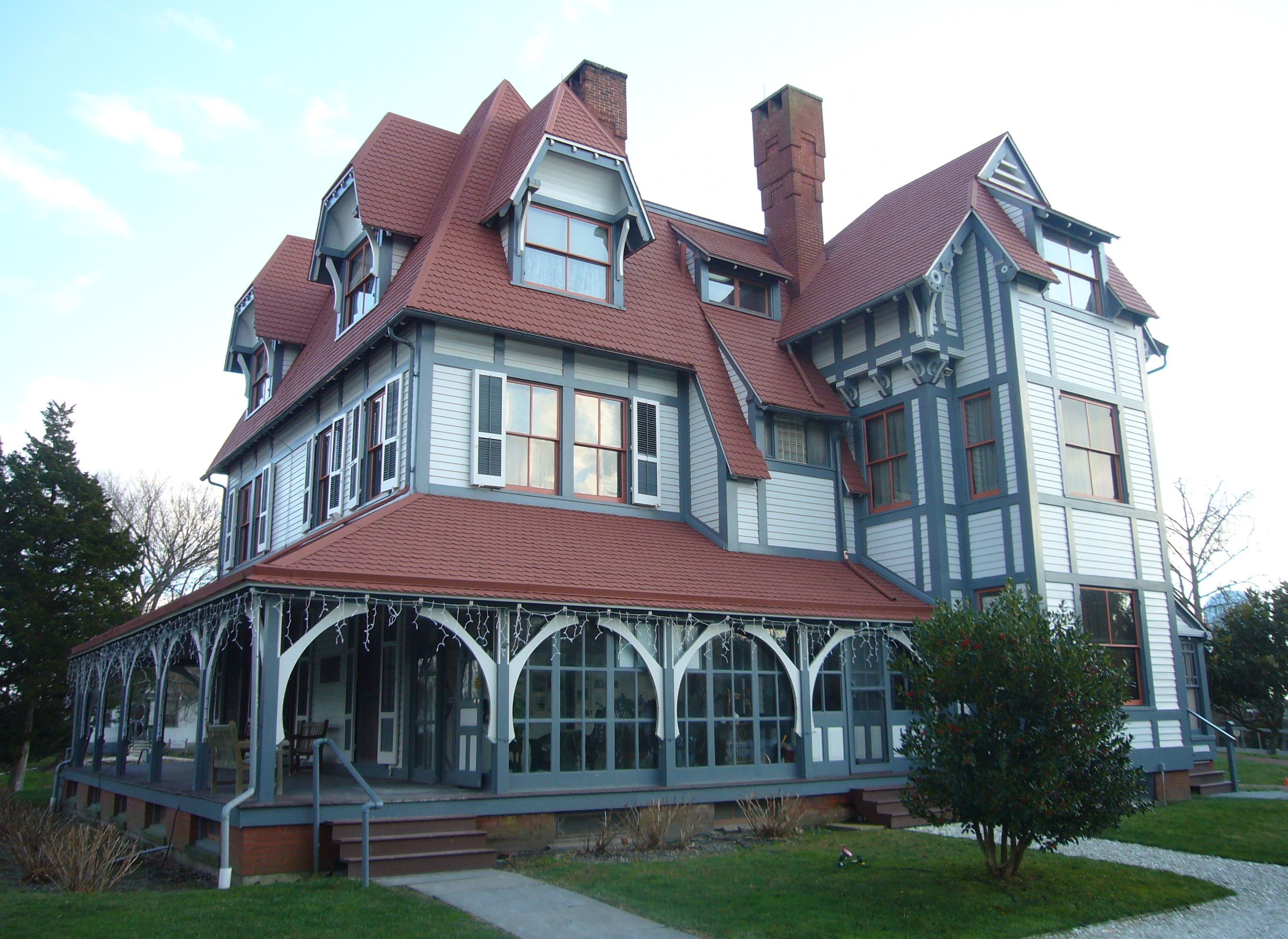
Emlen Physick Estate in Cape May Historic District, New Jersey, by Frank Furness

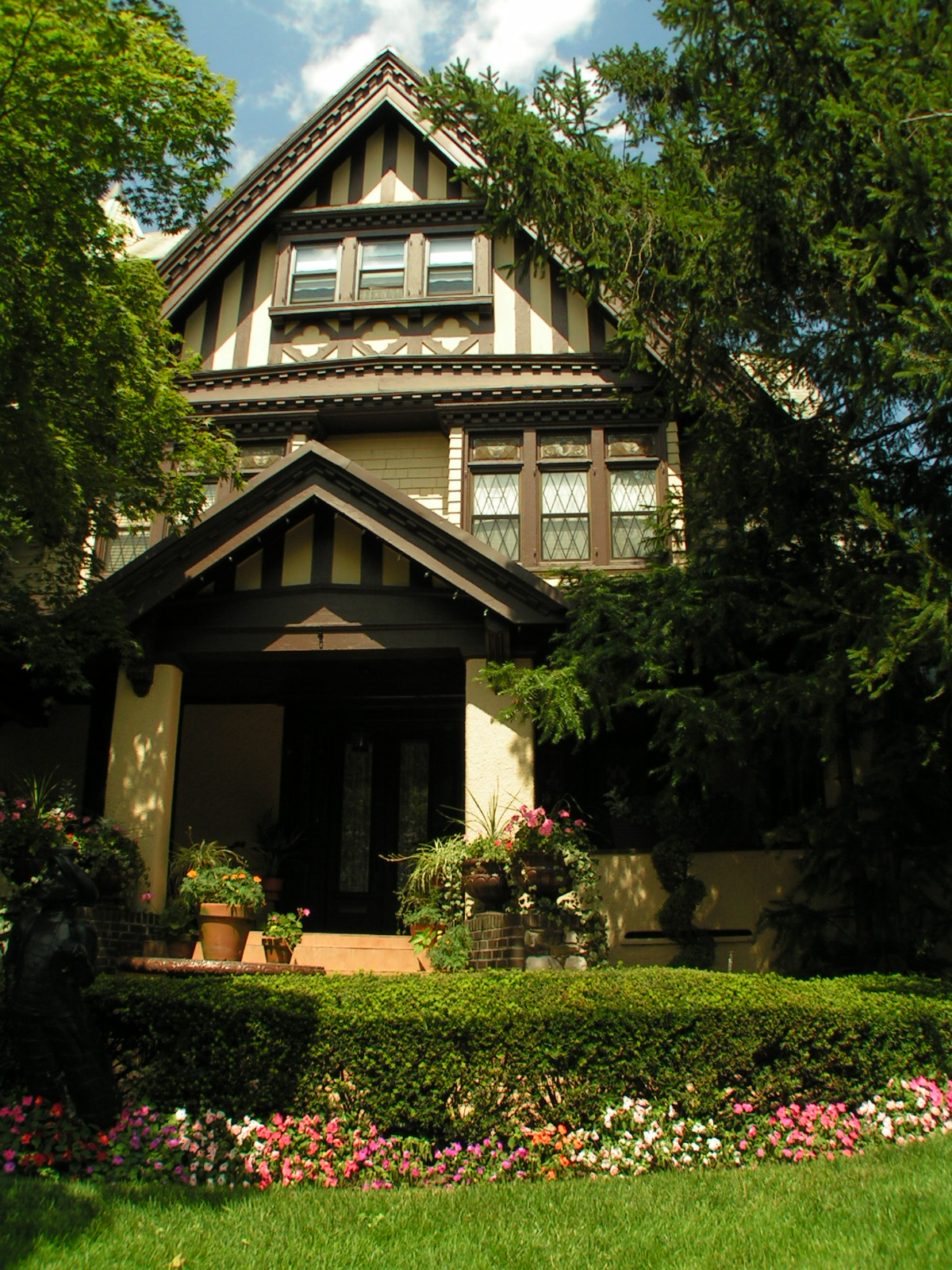
The Saitta House, Dyker Heights, Brooklyn, New York, built in 1899 is designed in the Queen Anne style

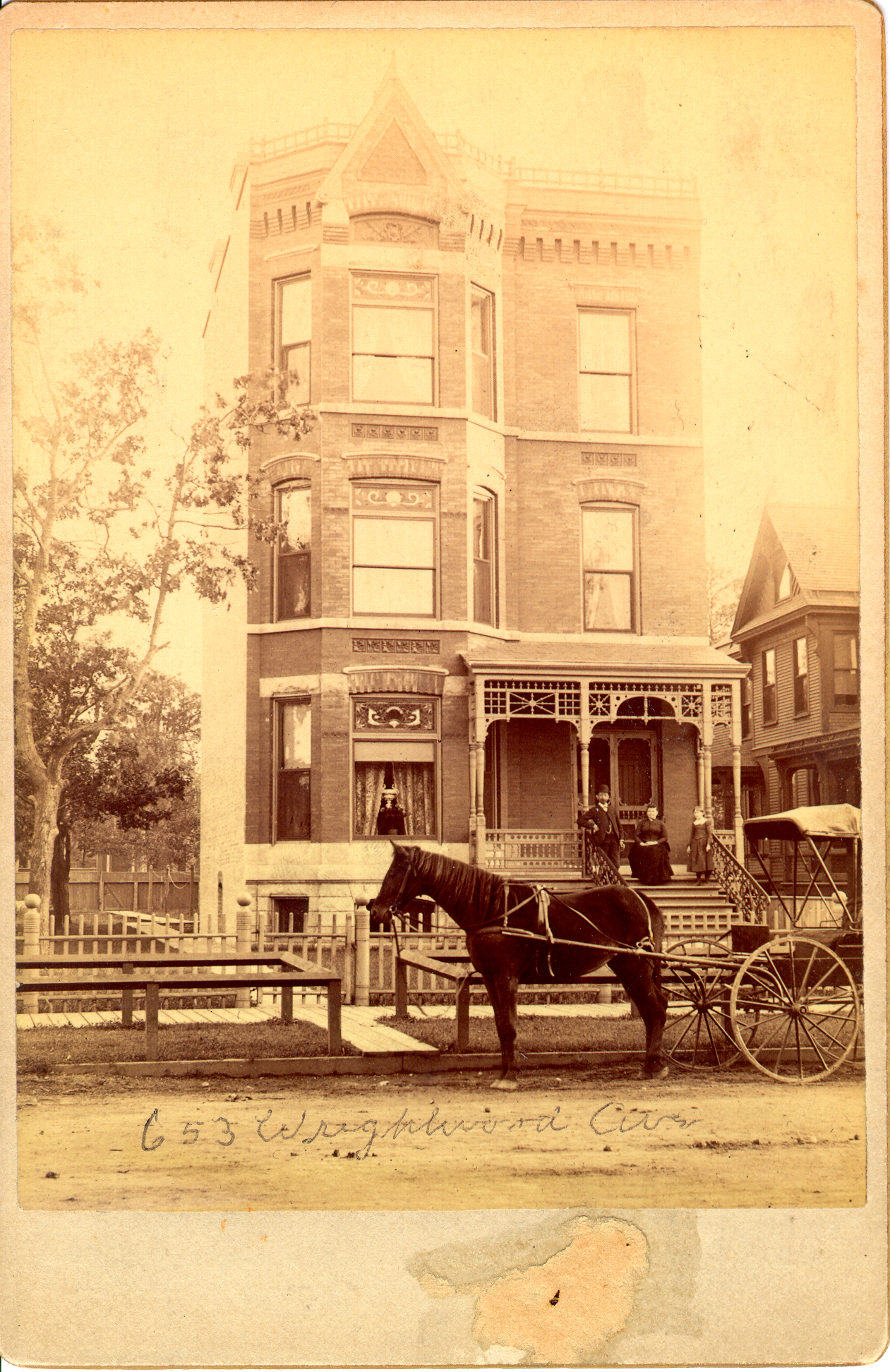
1880s photo of 653 W Wrightwood (now 655 W Wrightwood) in the Lincoln Park neighborhood of Chicago, Illinois

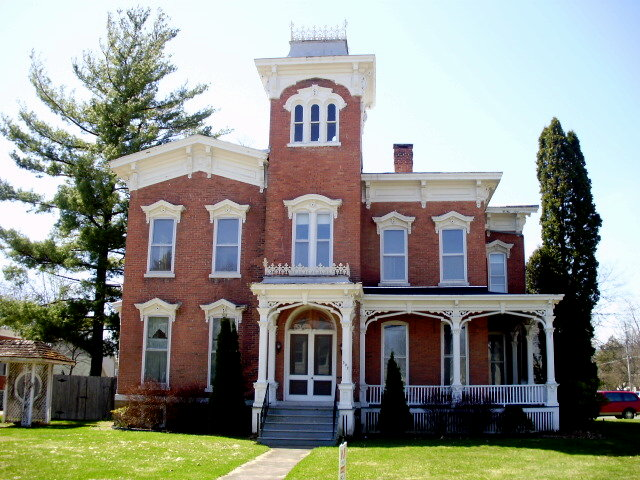
The Italianate style Farnam Mansion in Oneida, New York. Built circa 1862

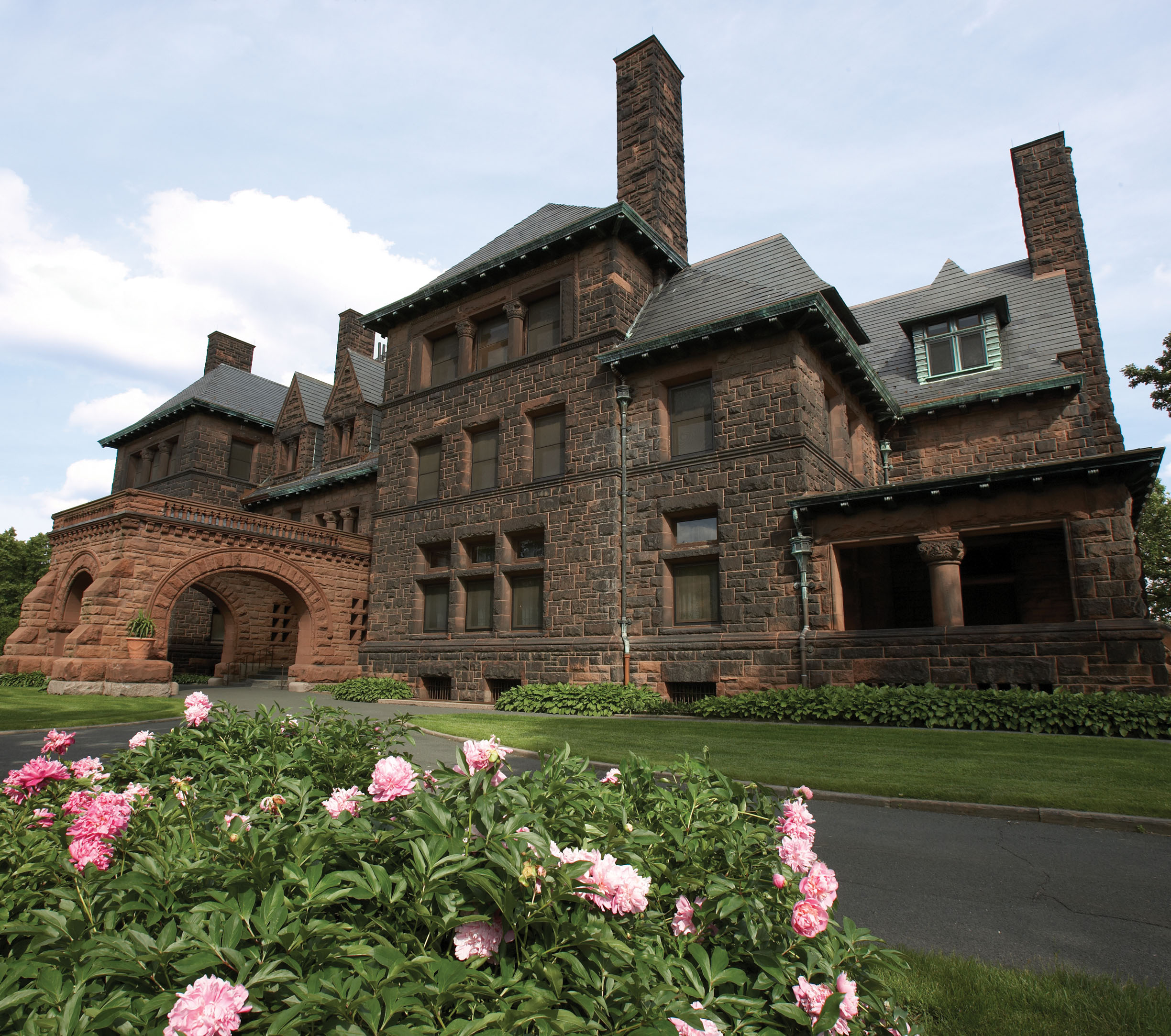
James J. Hill House in St. Paul, Minnesota, built in 1891

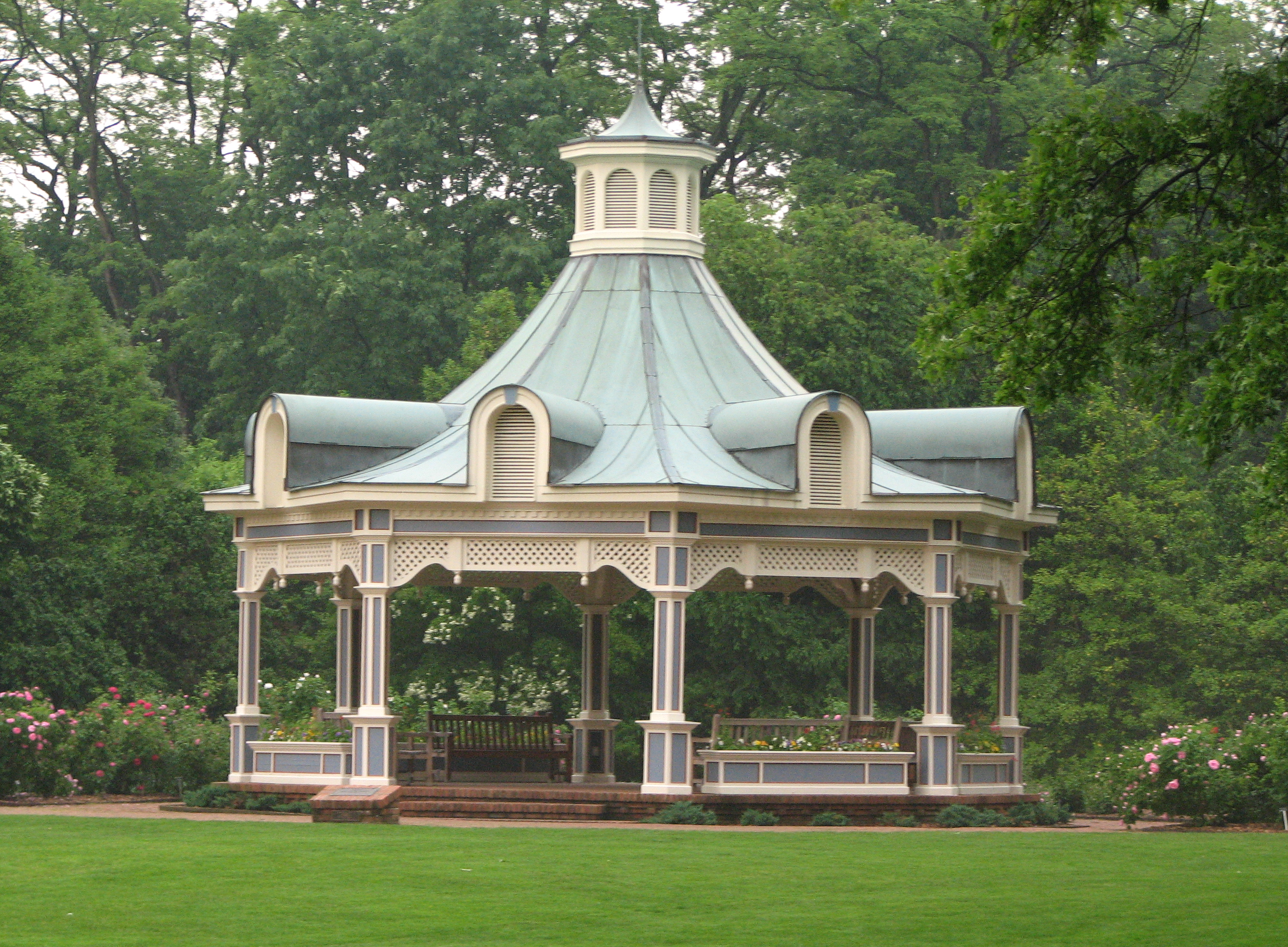
Victorian gazebo in Ohio

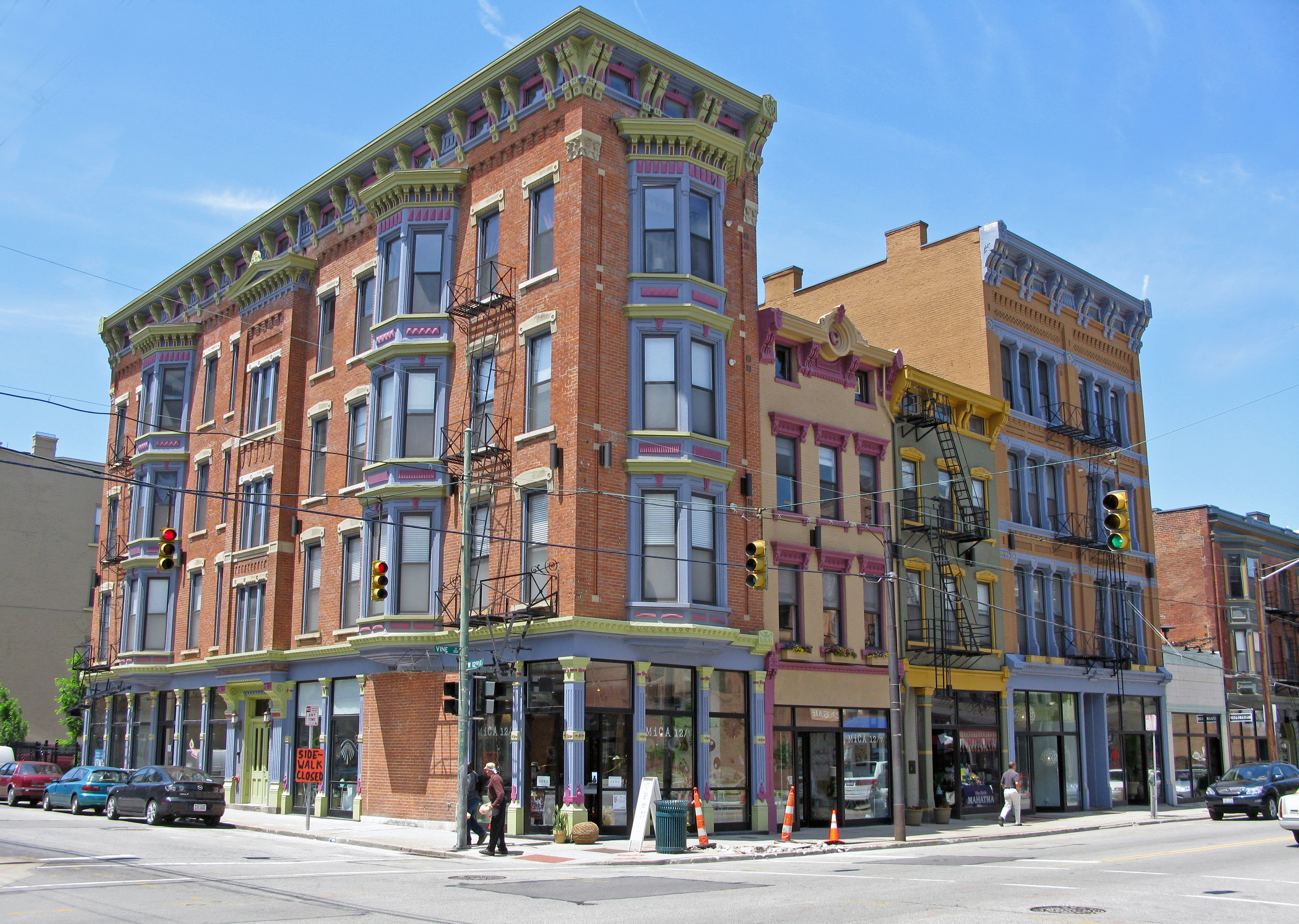
Series of Italianate tenements in Over-The-Rhine, Cincinnati, Ohio

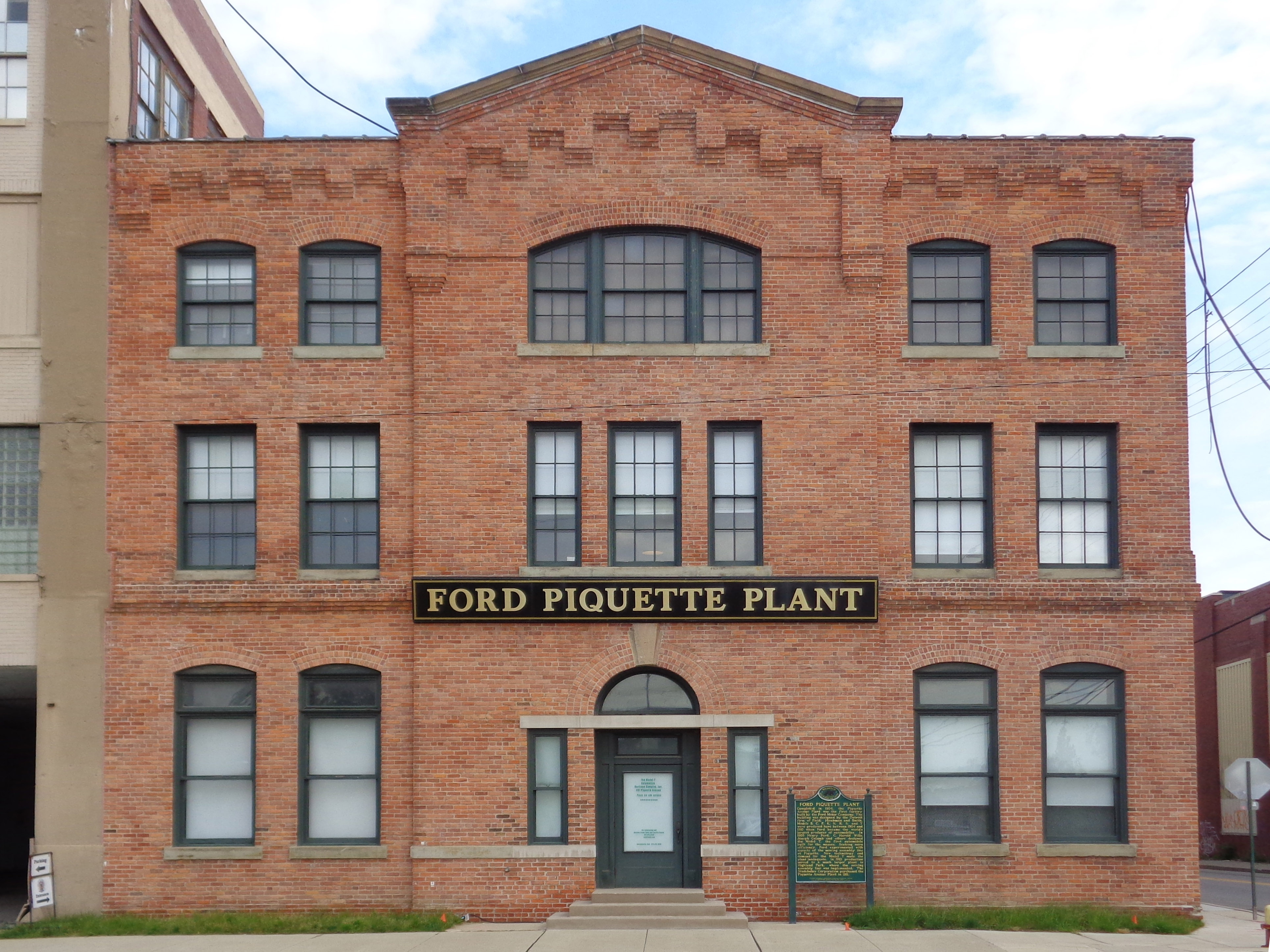
Ford Piquette Avenue Plant, Detroit, Michigan, built 1904

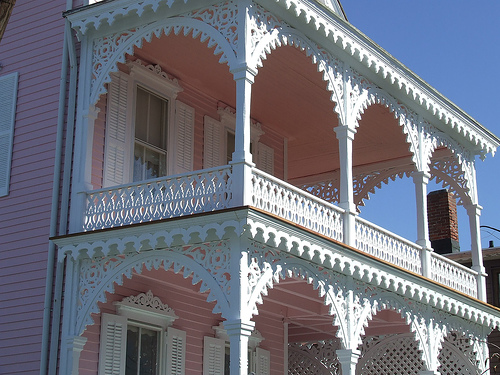
Gingerbread trim on an 1882 house in Cape May, New Jersey

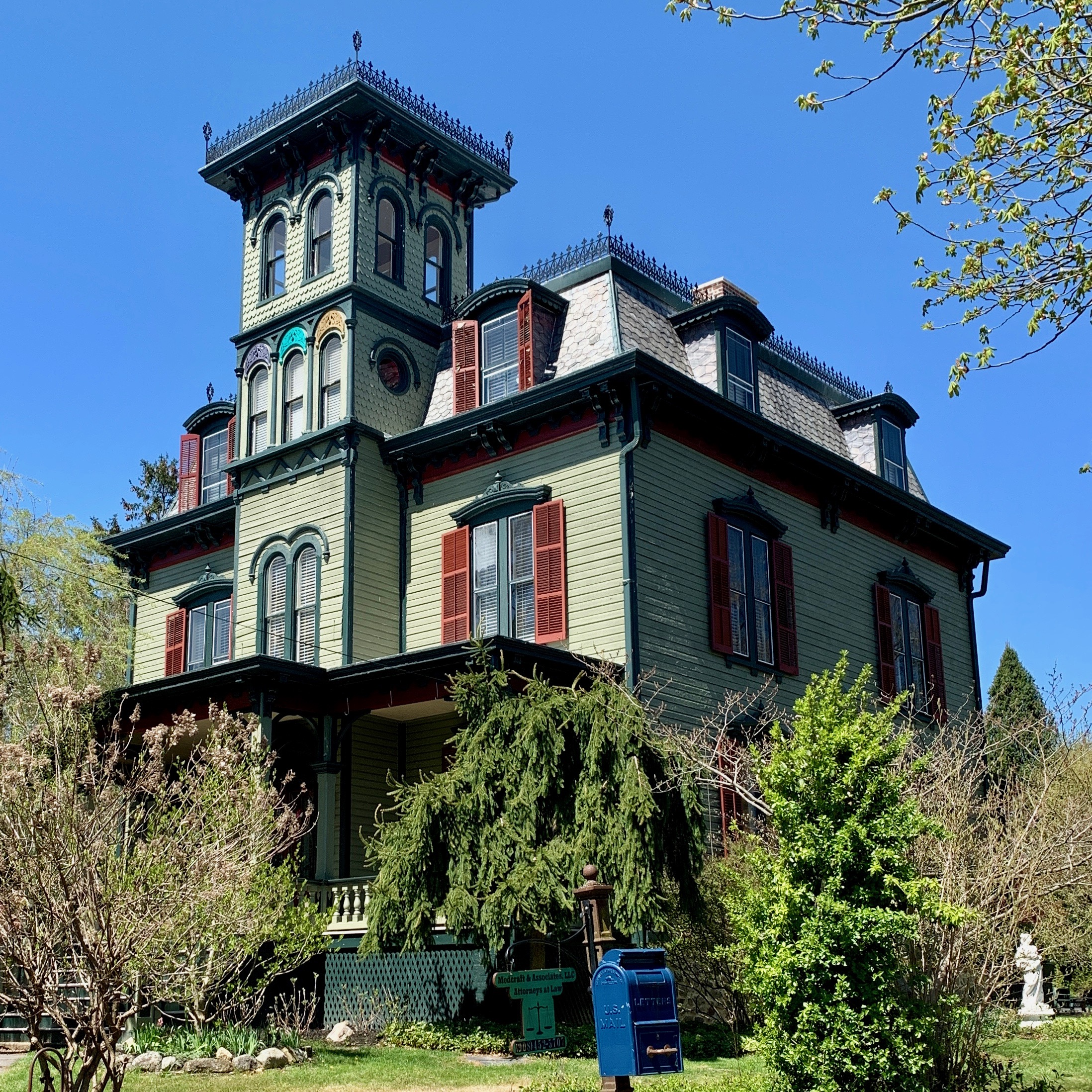
The Jacob C. Allen House (c. 1870) in Hackettstown, New Jersey

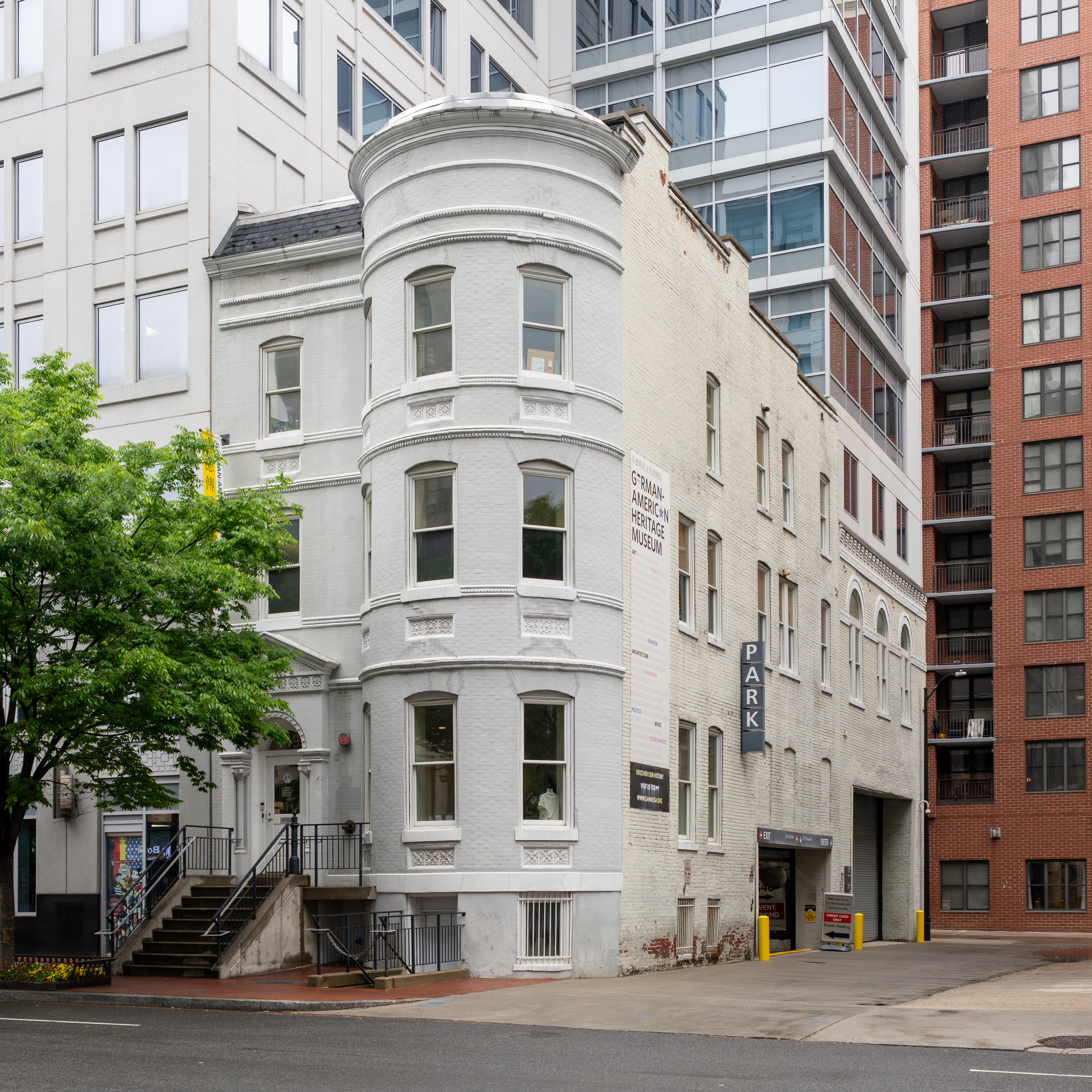
Hockemeyer Hall, Washington D.C., built in 1888

==== Canada ====
Canada's chief dominion architects designed numerous federal buildings over the course of the Victorian era. Thomas Fuller's completion of the Canadian Parliament Buildings in 1866, in particular, established a High Victorian Gothic influence over Canadian architectural design for several consecutive decades, producing many public buildings, churches, residences, industrial buildings, and hotels.

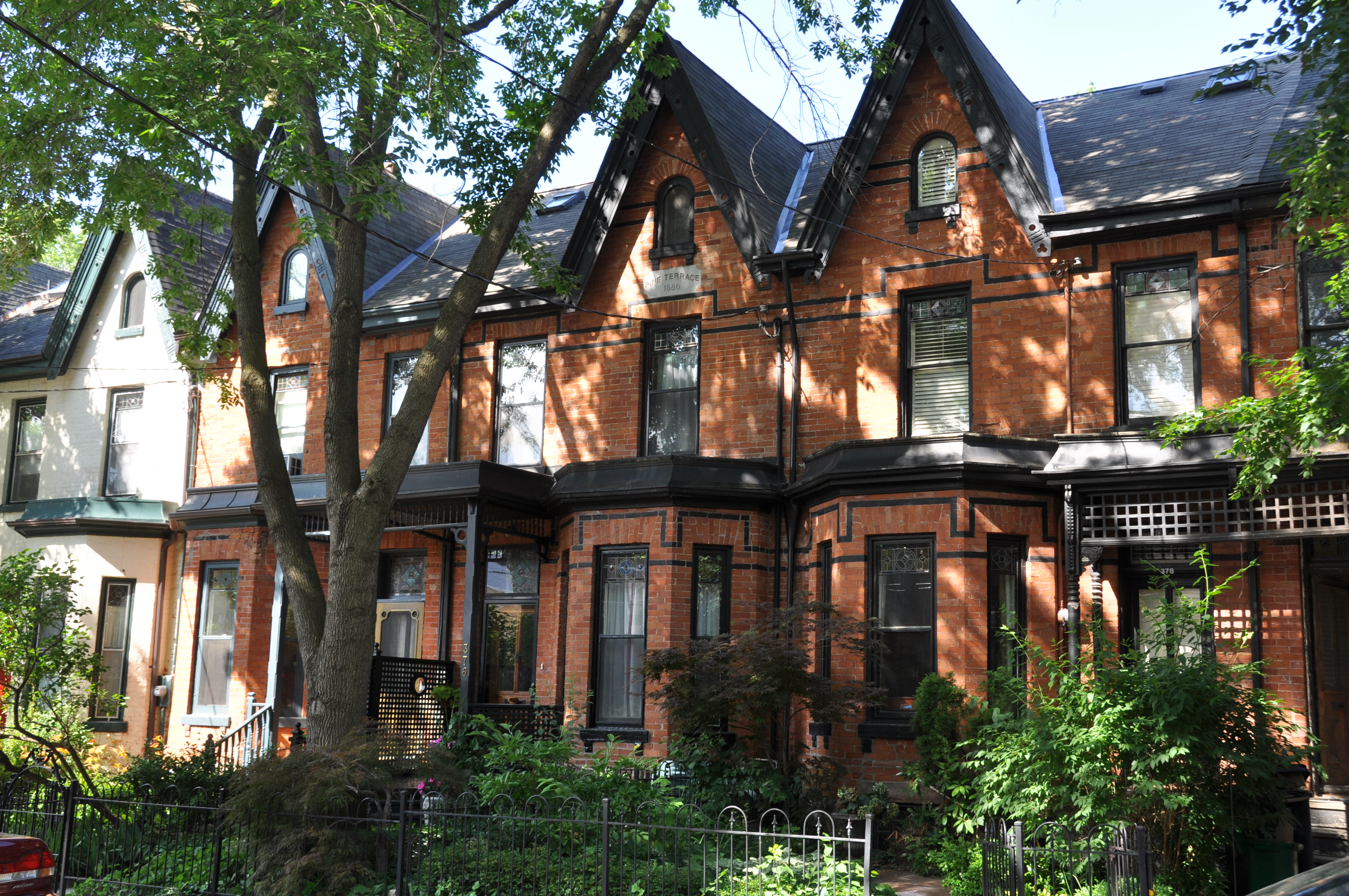
Brick Victorian styled homes were built throughout Cabbagetown, Toronto in the late 19th and early 20th century.

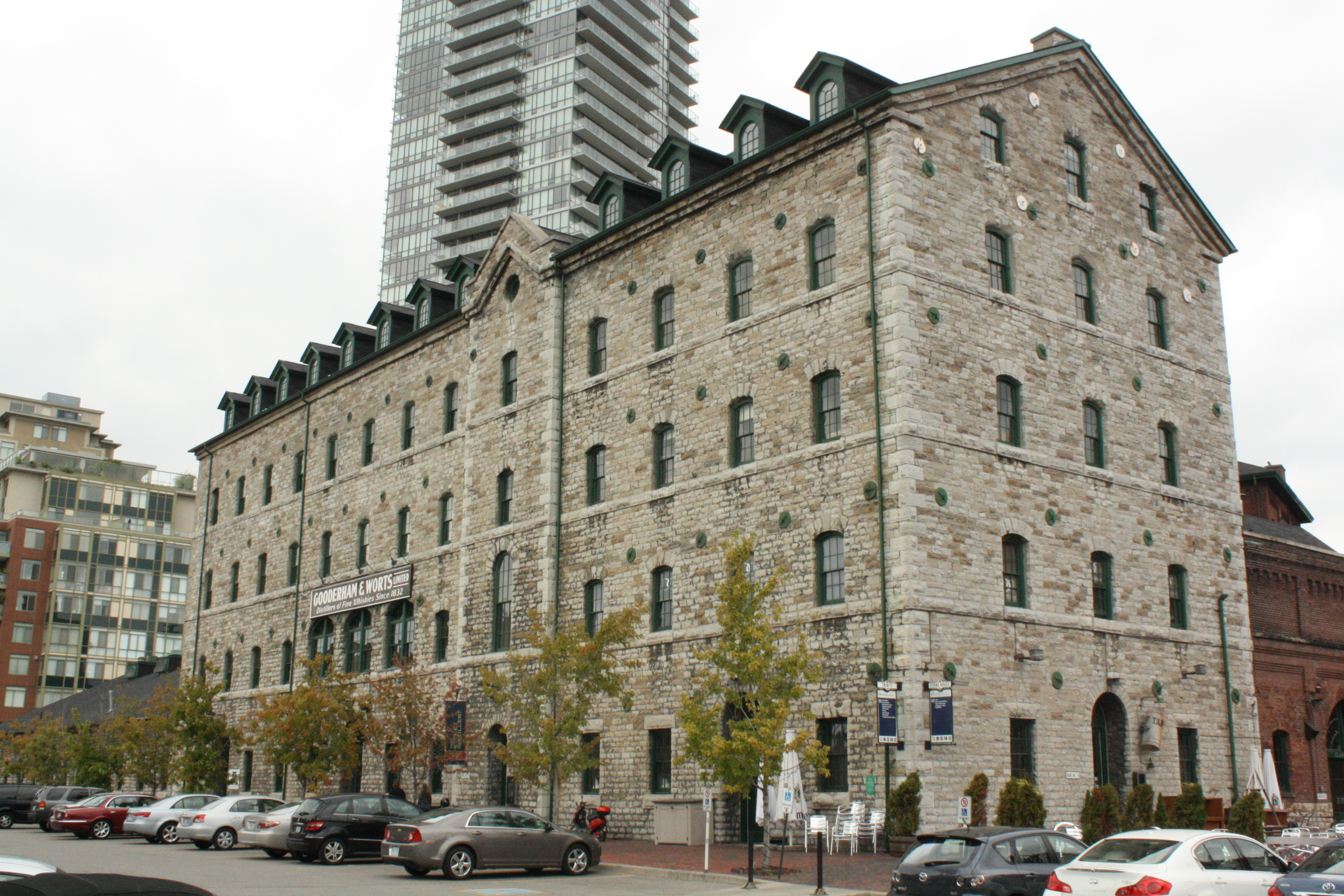
The Stone Distillery, an example of Victorian industrial architecture

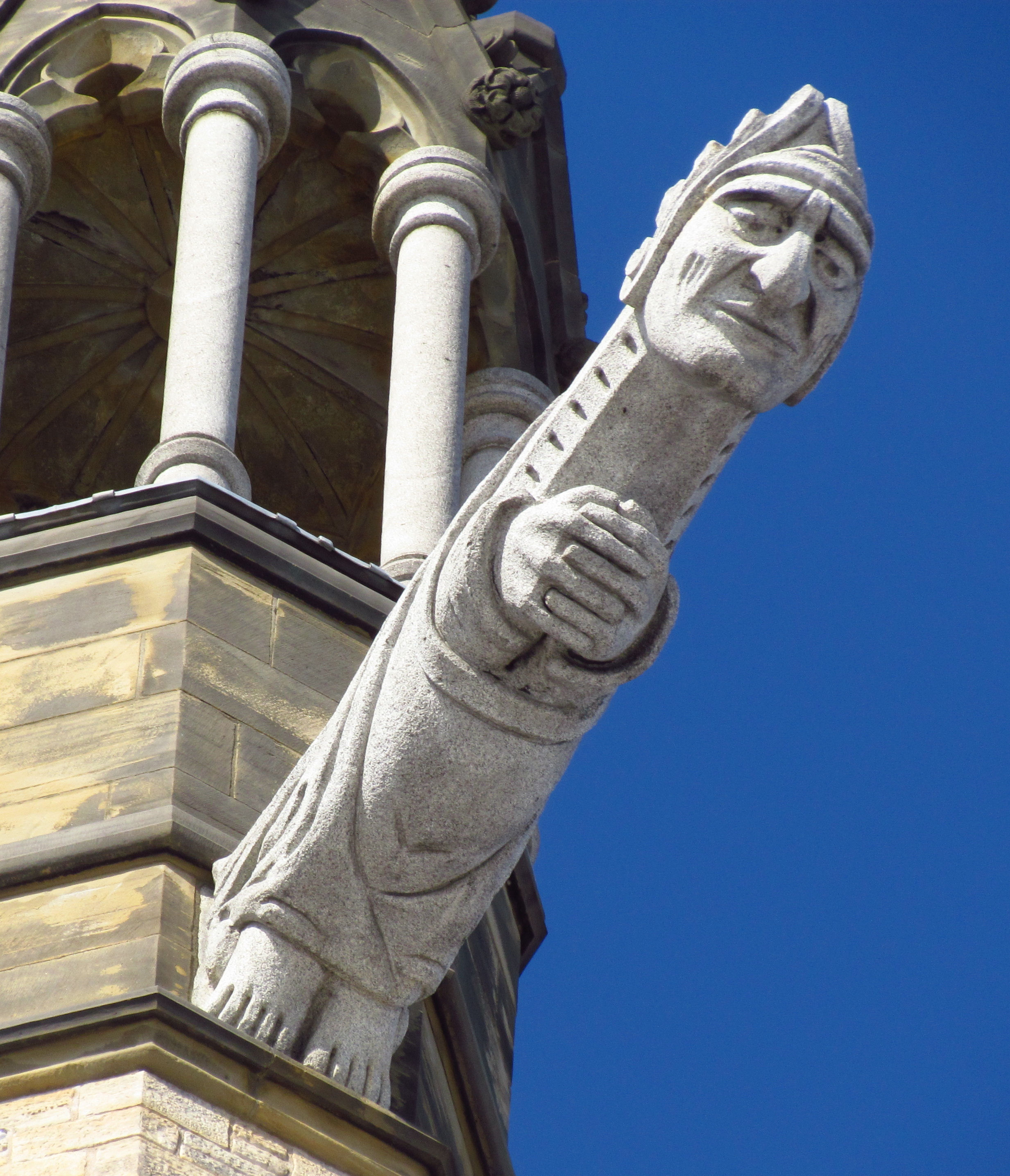
One of four grotesques at the corners of the Peace Tower

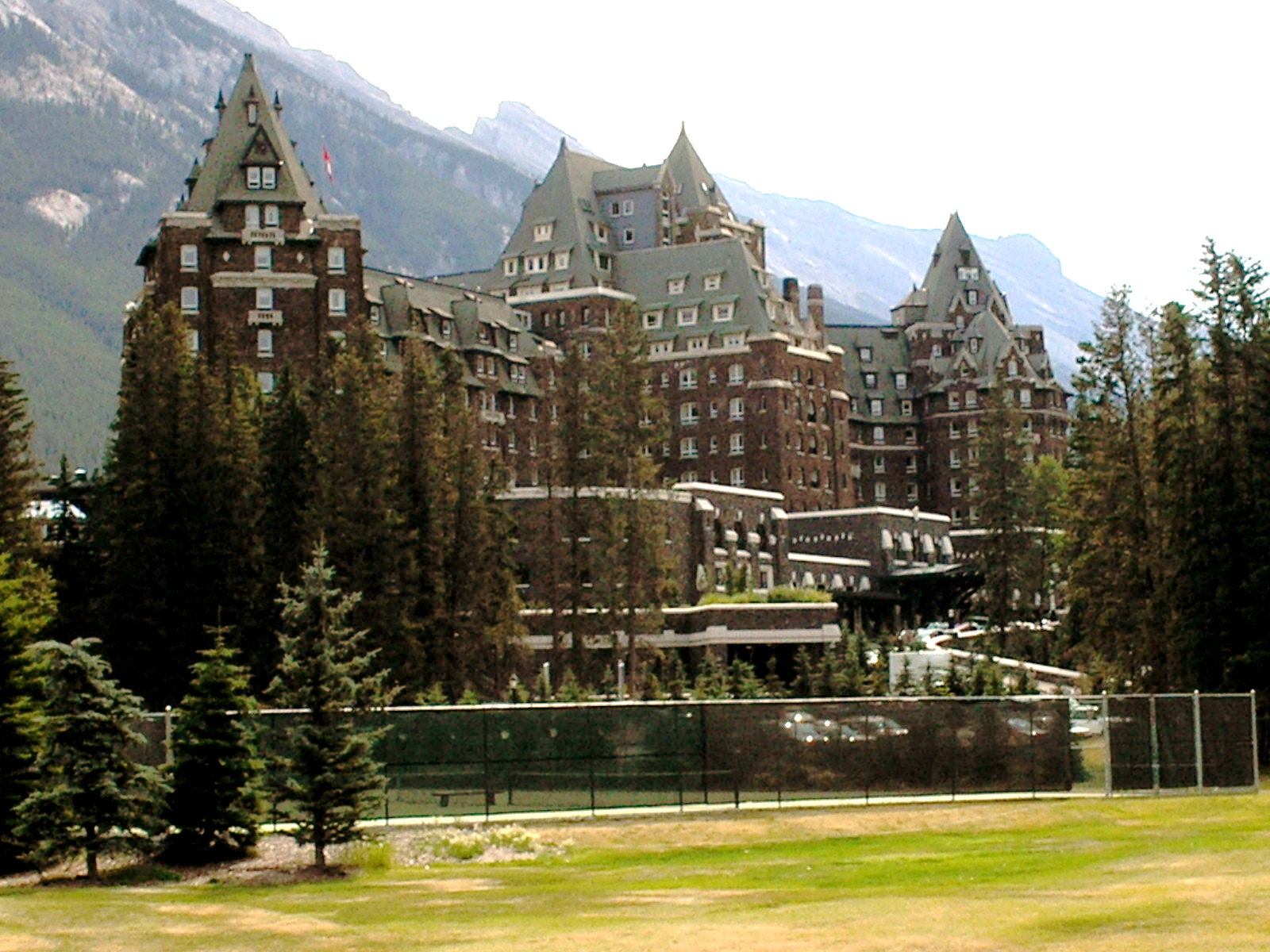
Banff Springs Hotel

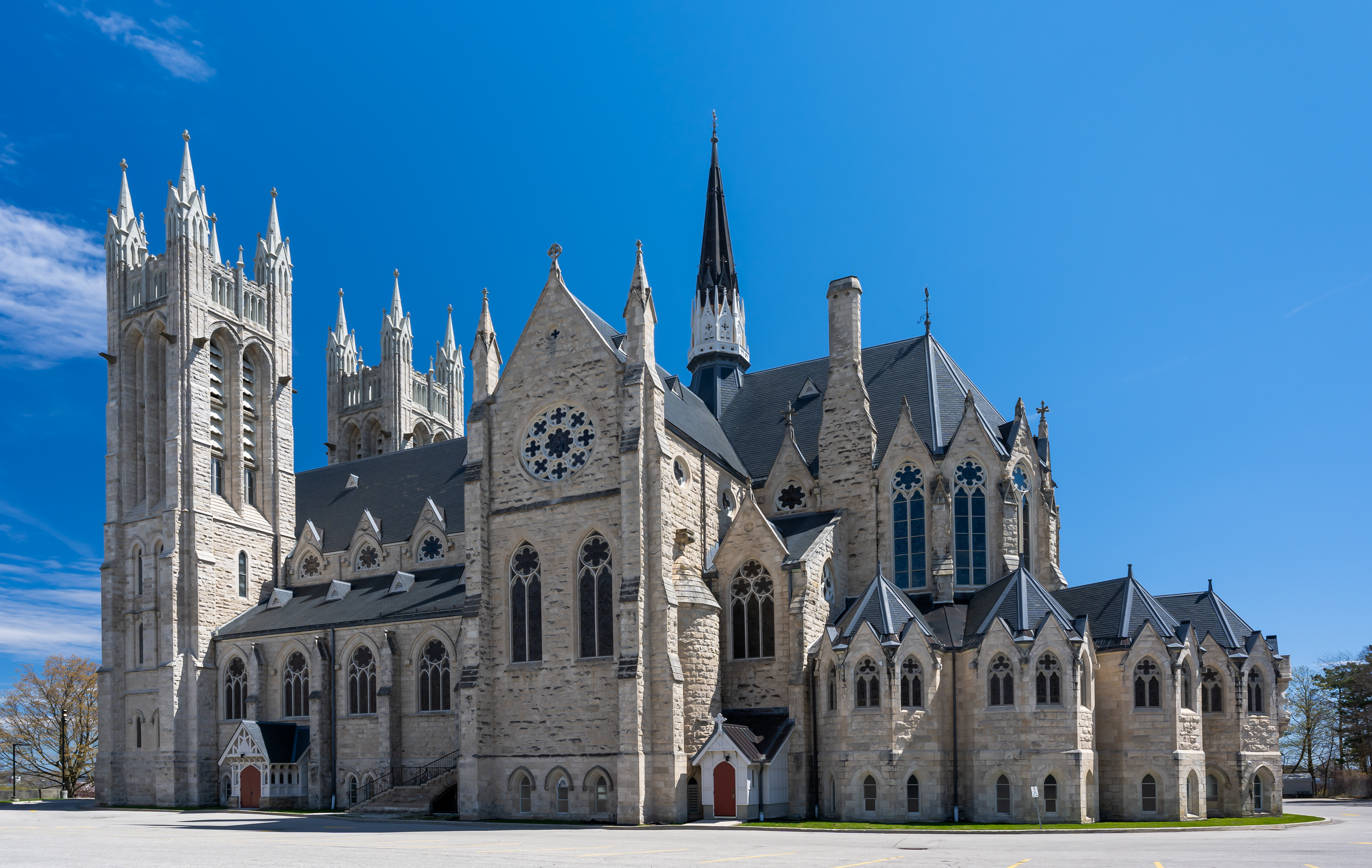
Basilica of Our Lady Immaculate

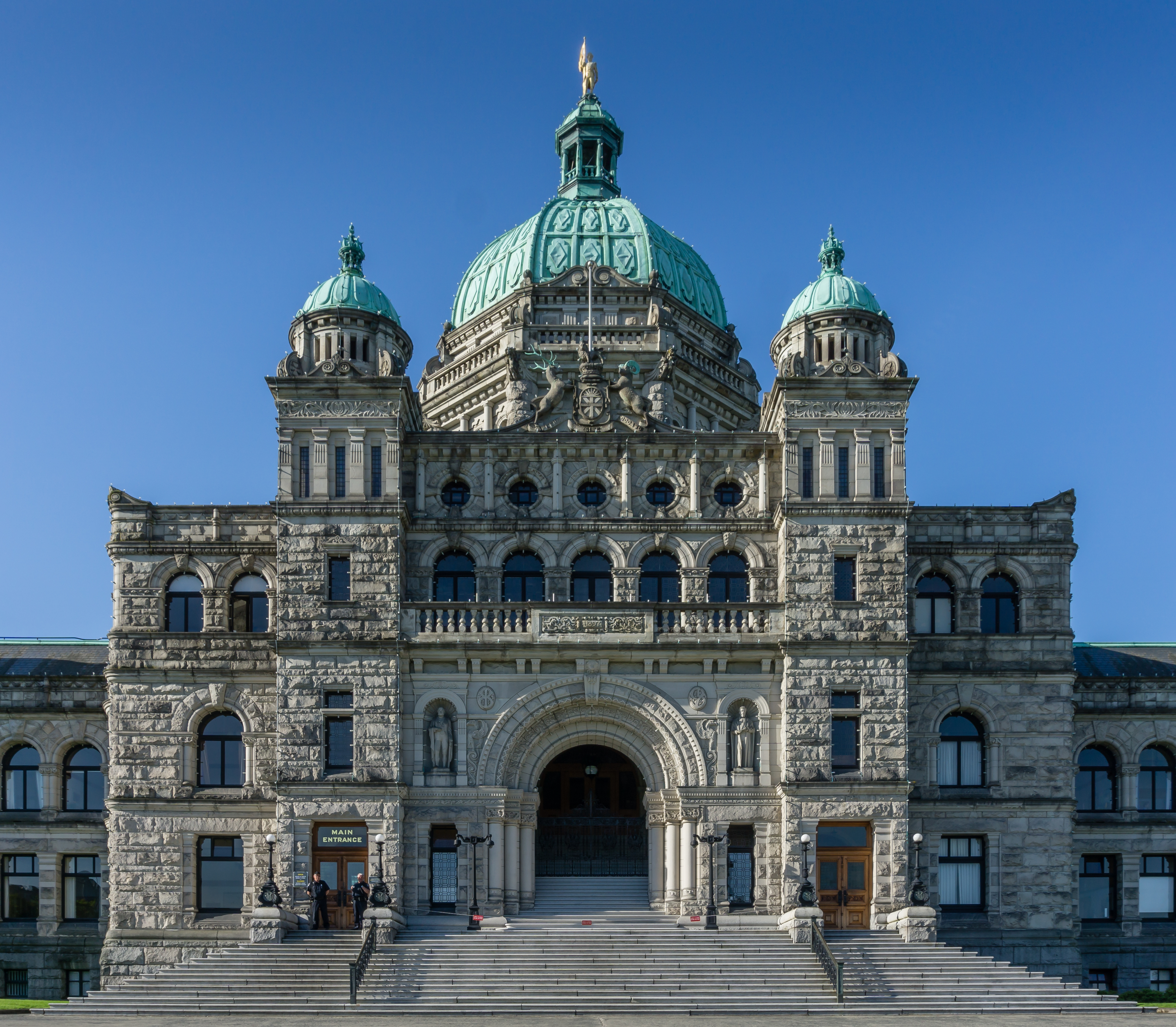
British Columbia Parliament Buildings (main block)

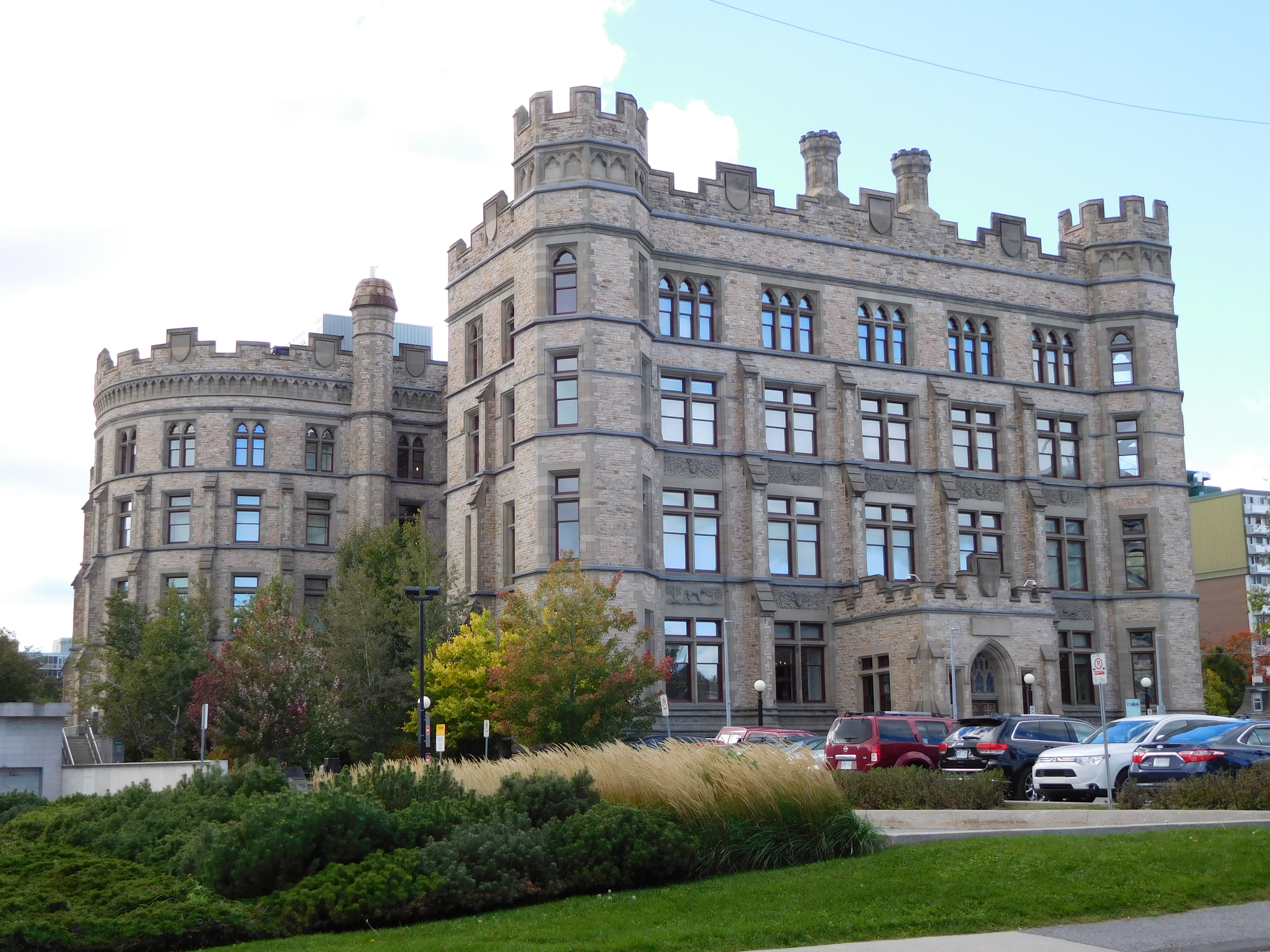
Canadian Museum of Nature

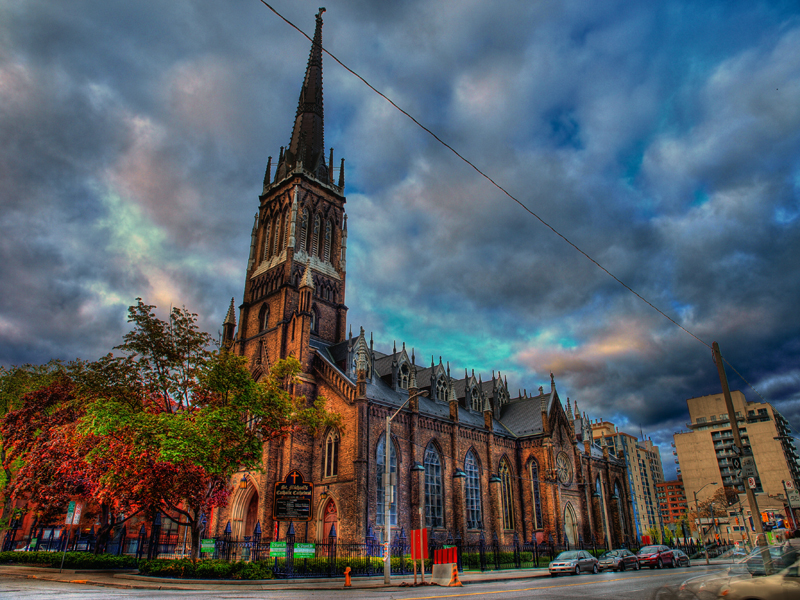
Cathedral Church of St. James (Toronto)

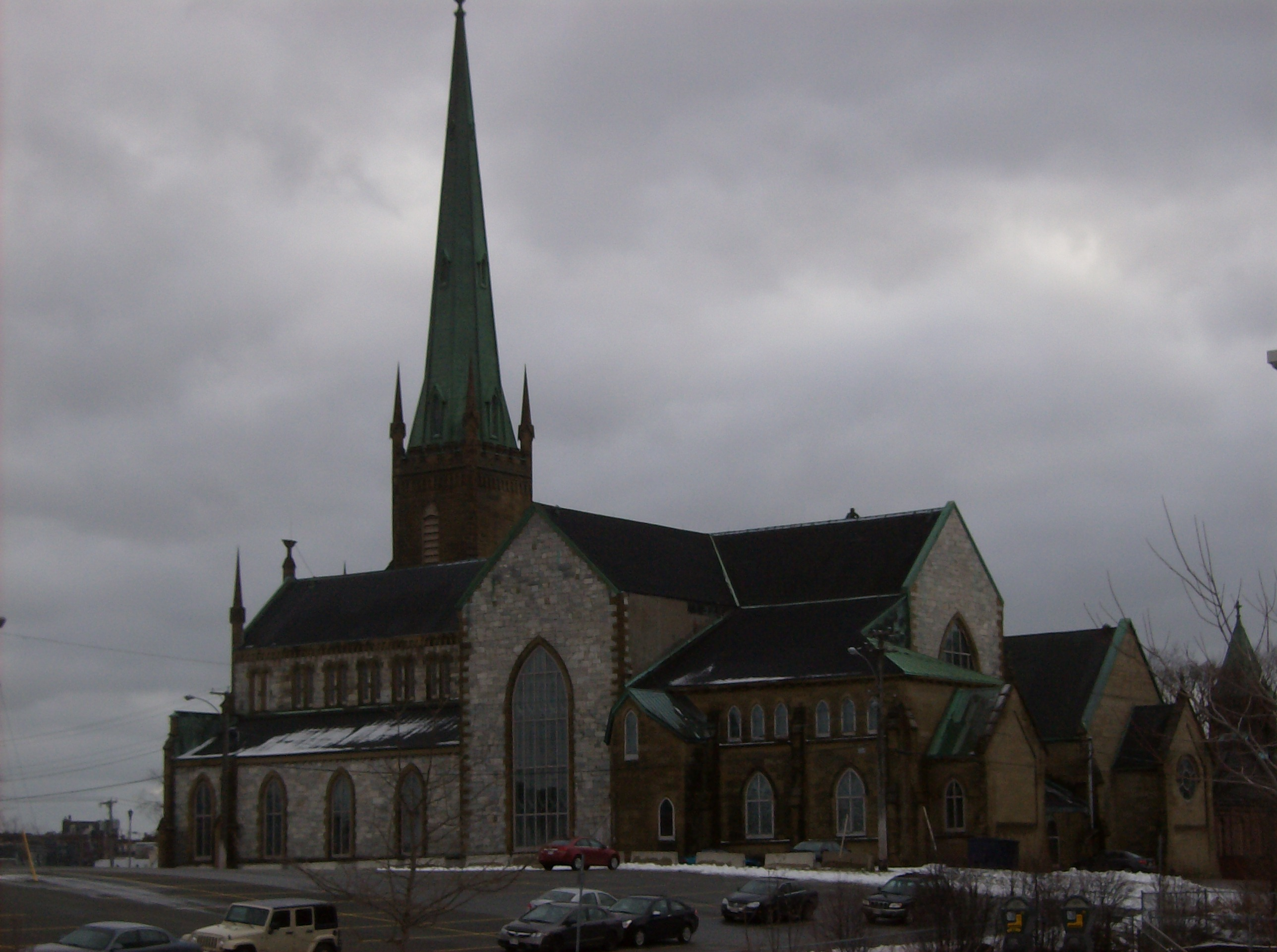
Cathedral of the Immaculate Conception (Saint John, New Brunswick)

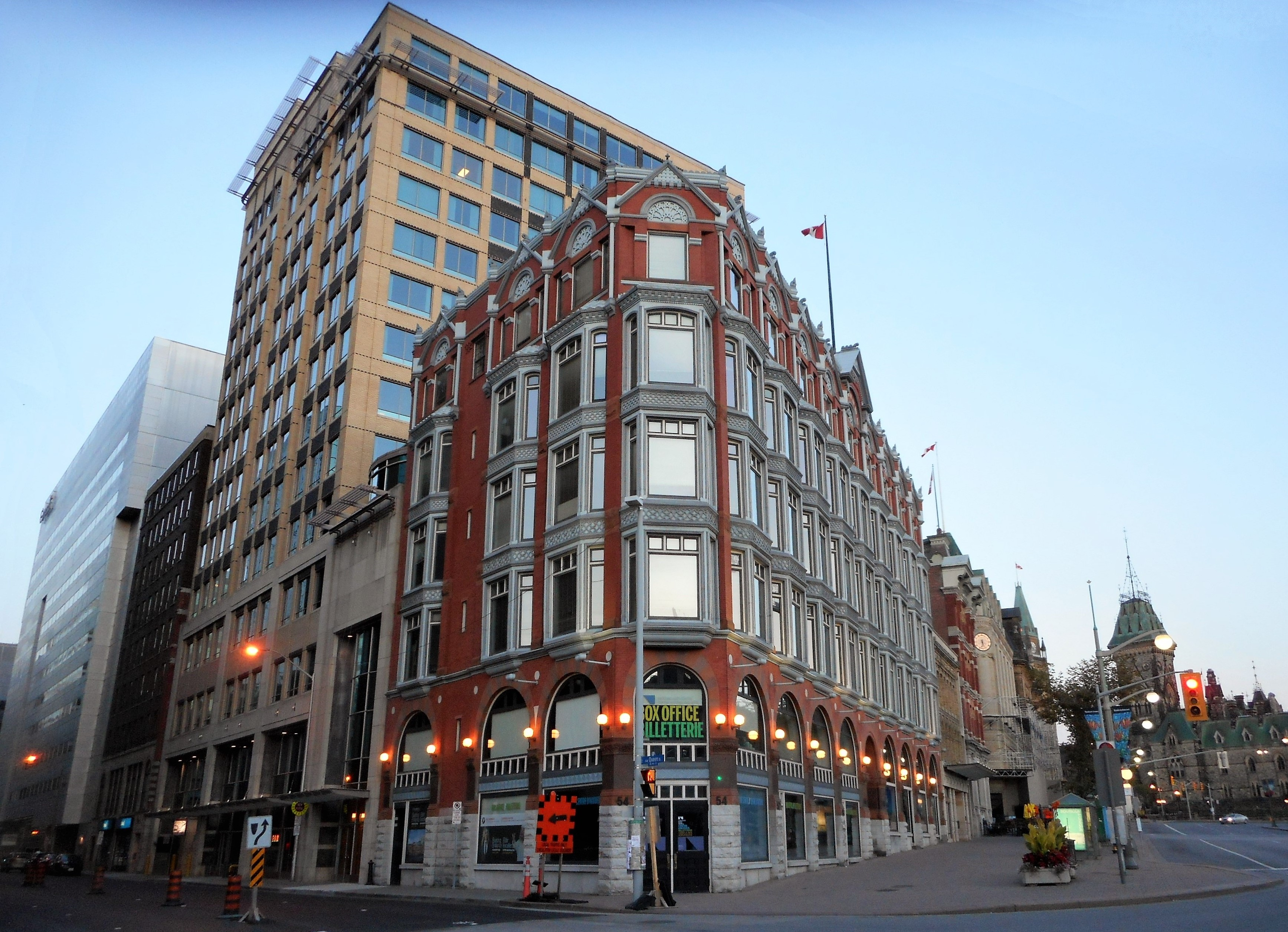
Central Chambers (Ottawa)

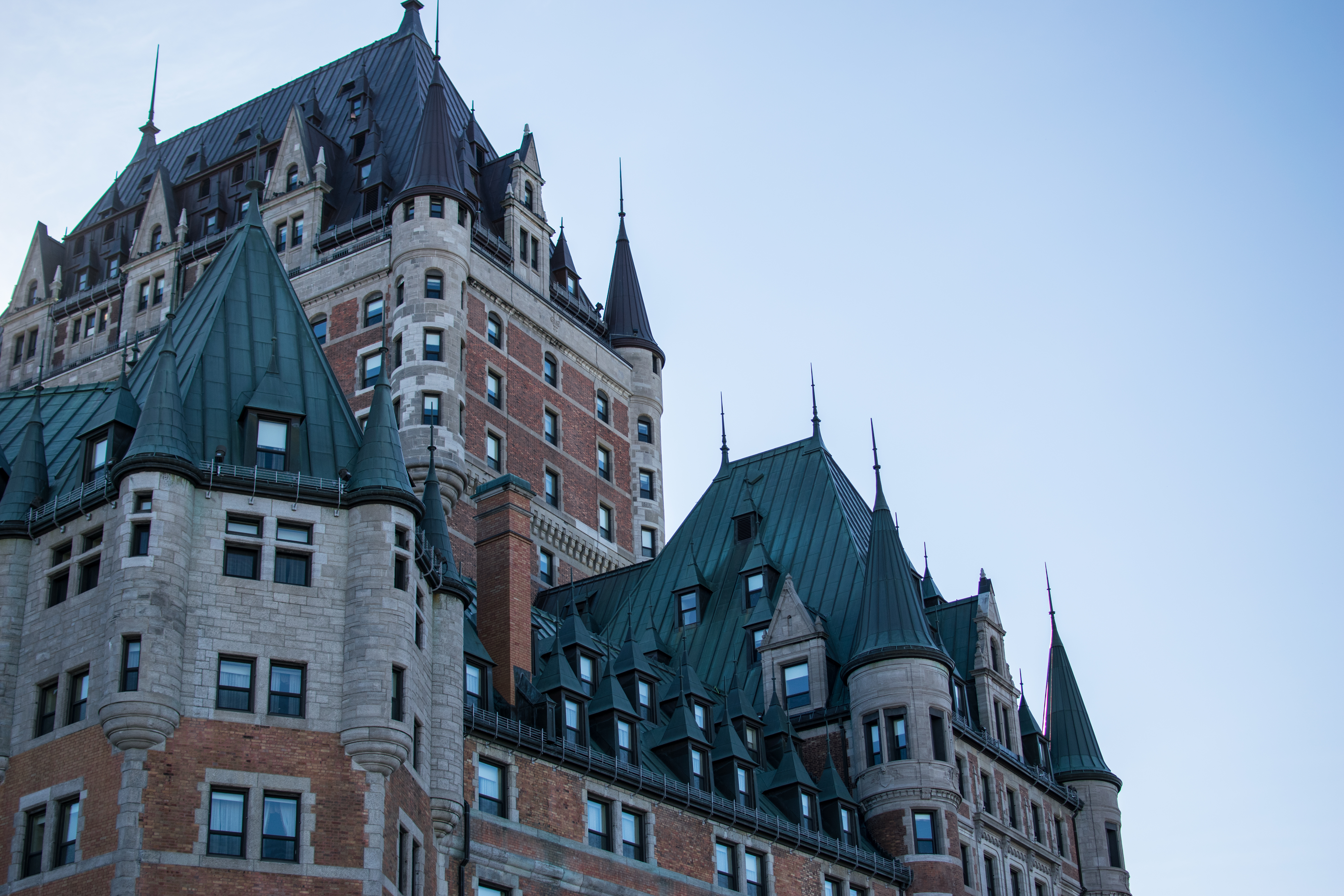
Château Frontenac

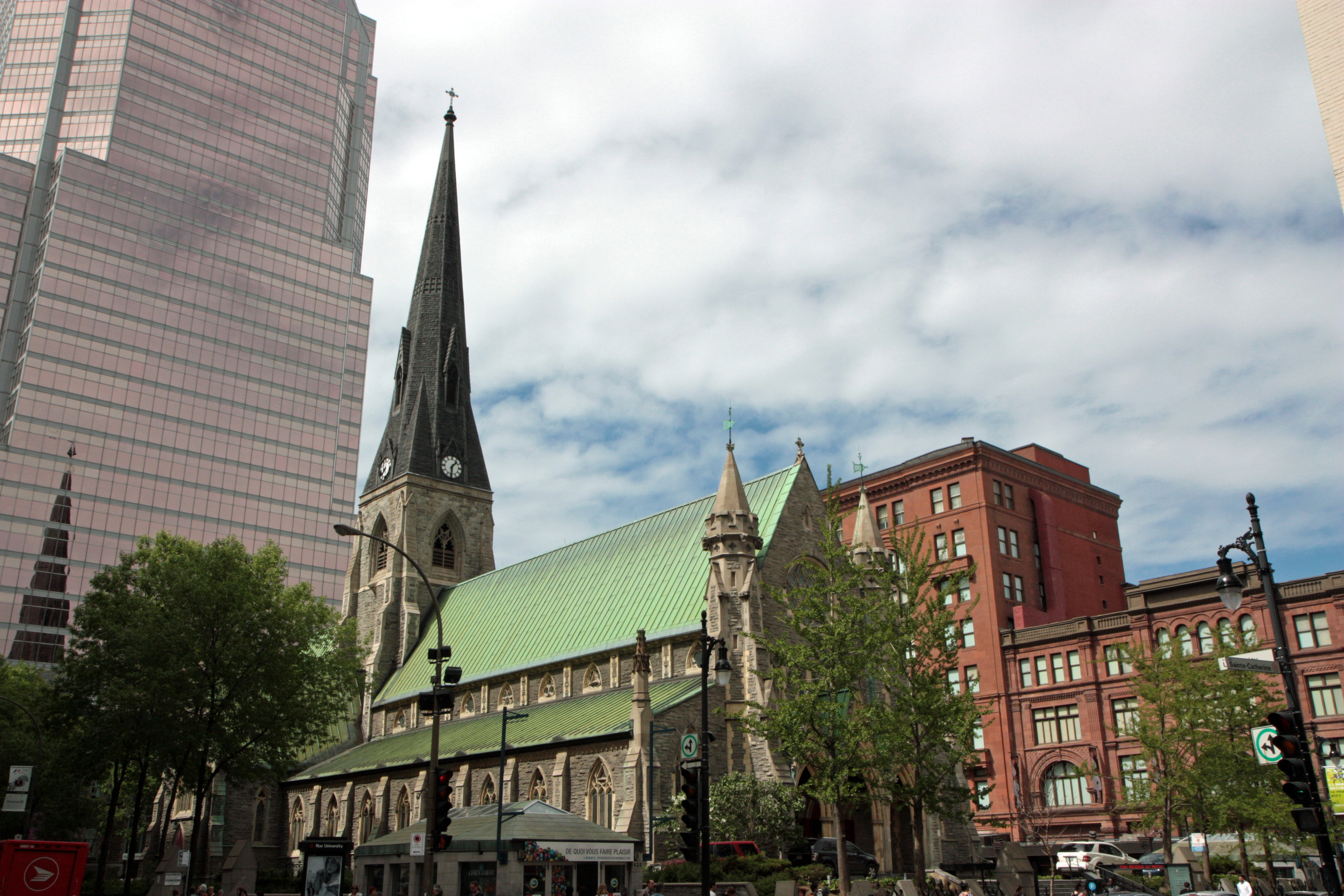
Christ Church Cathedral (Montreal)

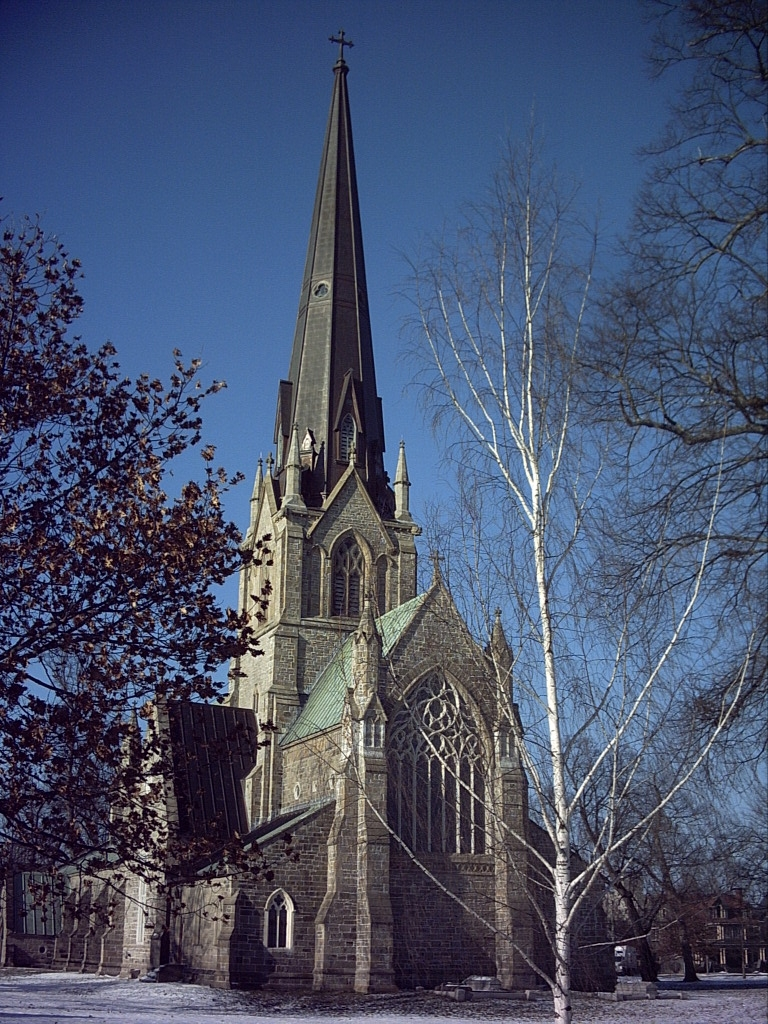
Christ Church Cathedral (Fredericton)

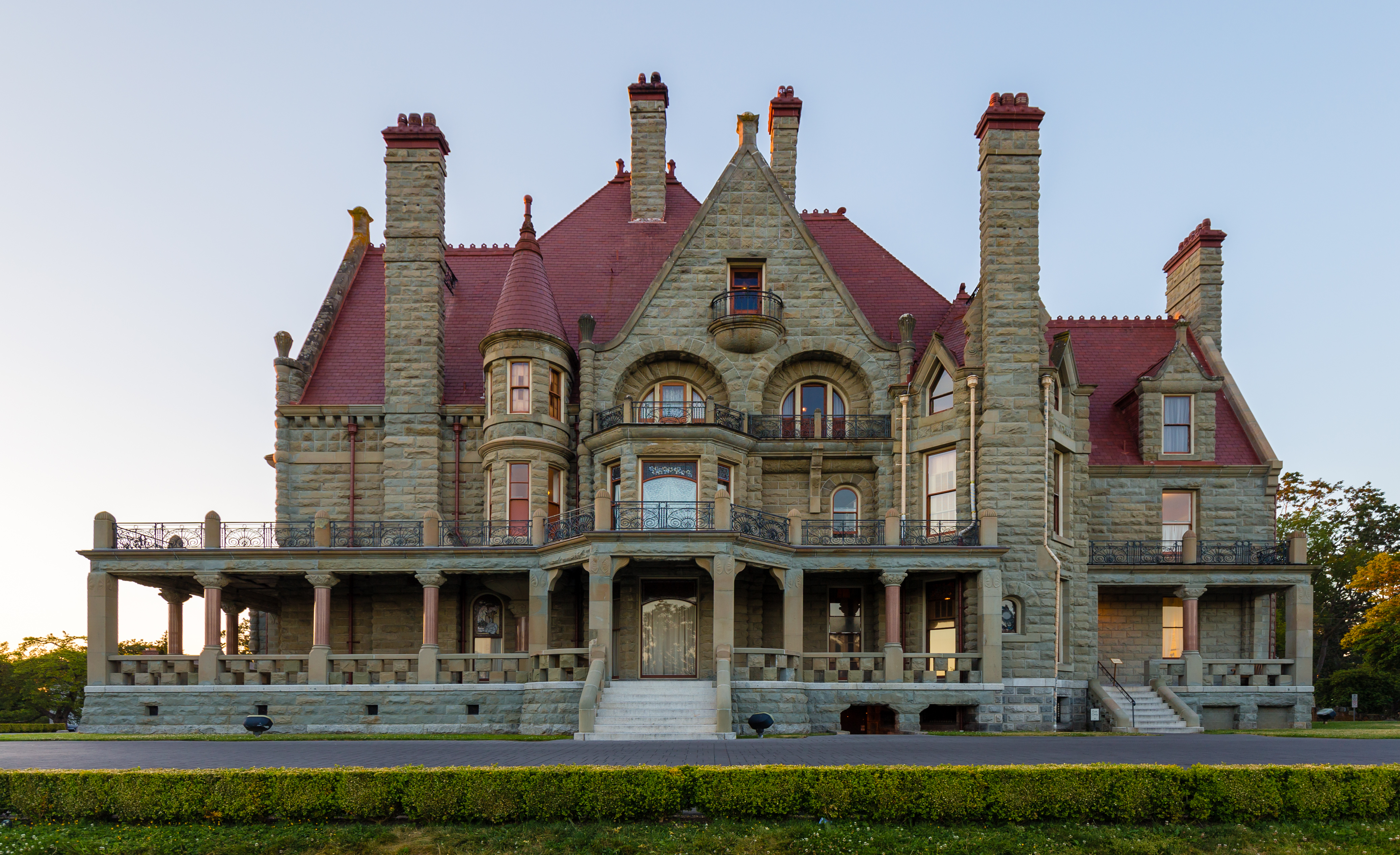
Craigdarroch Castle

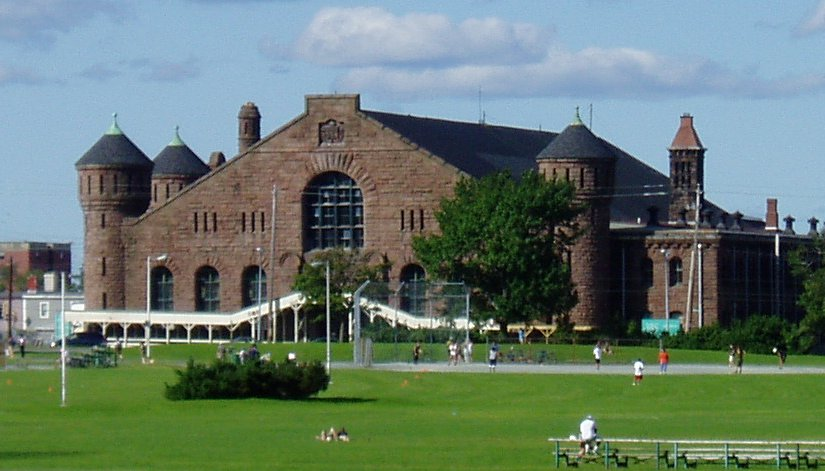
Halifax Armoury

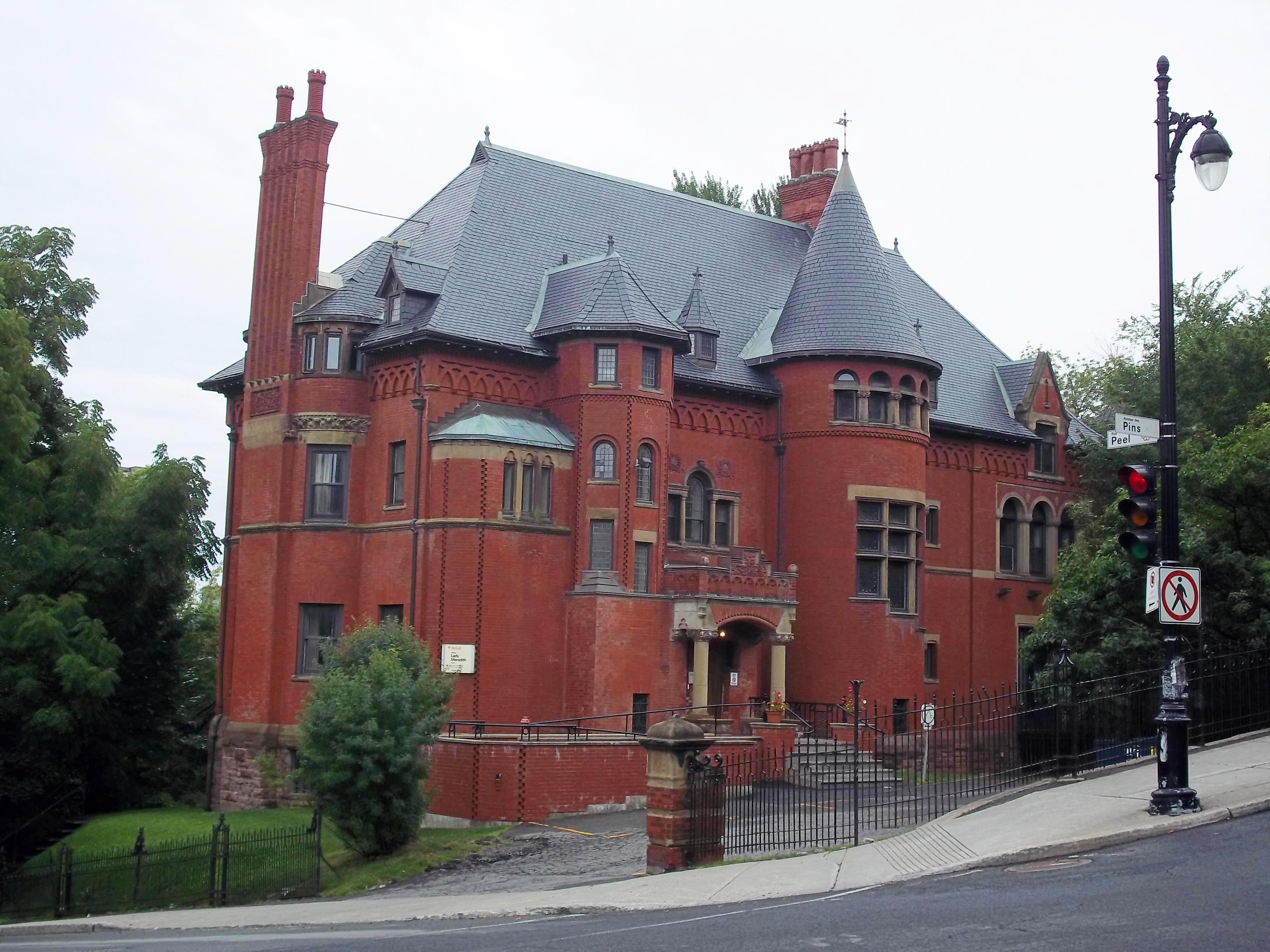
Lady Meredith House

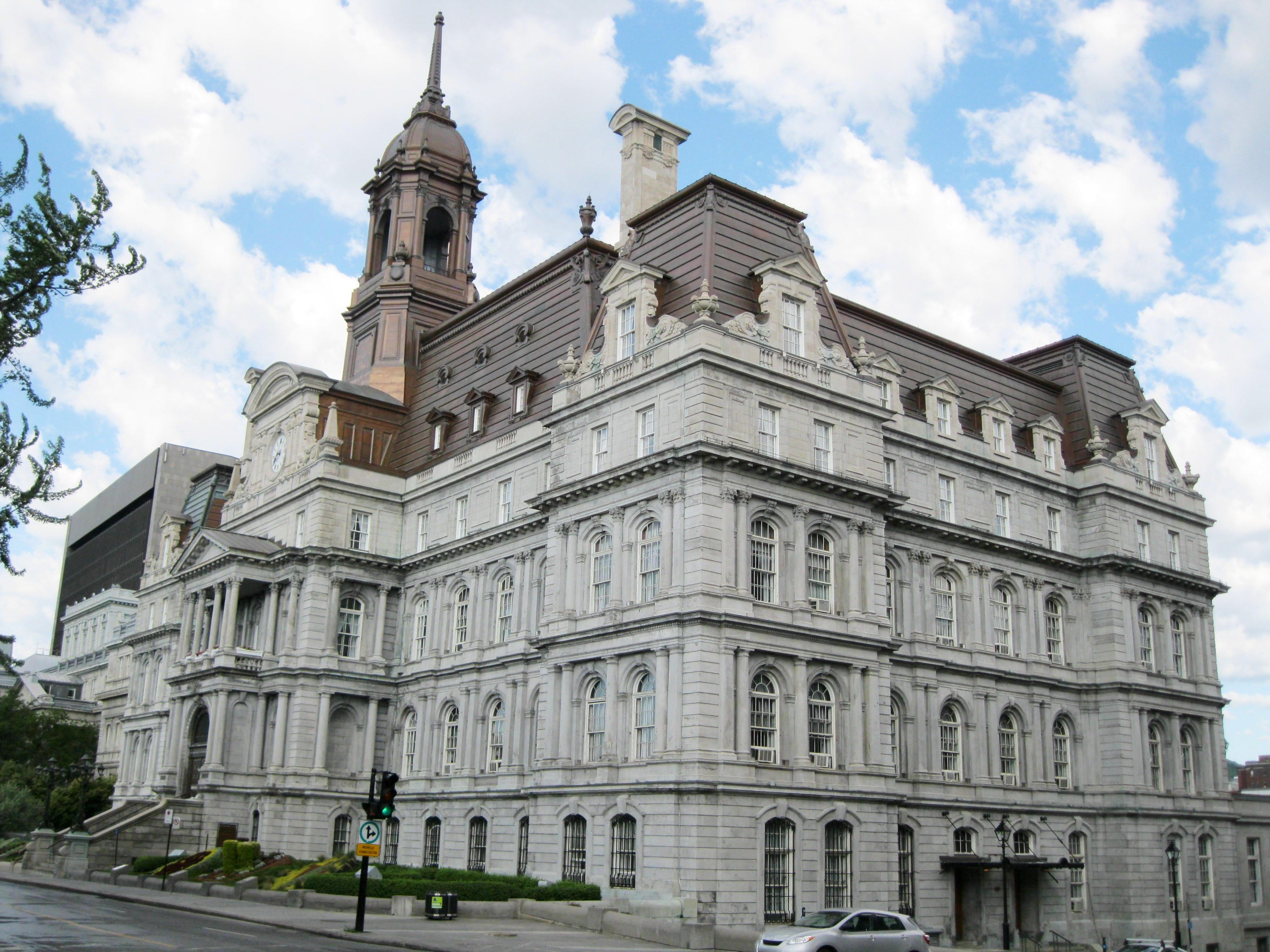
Montreal City Hall

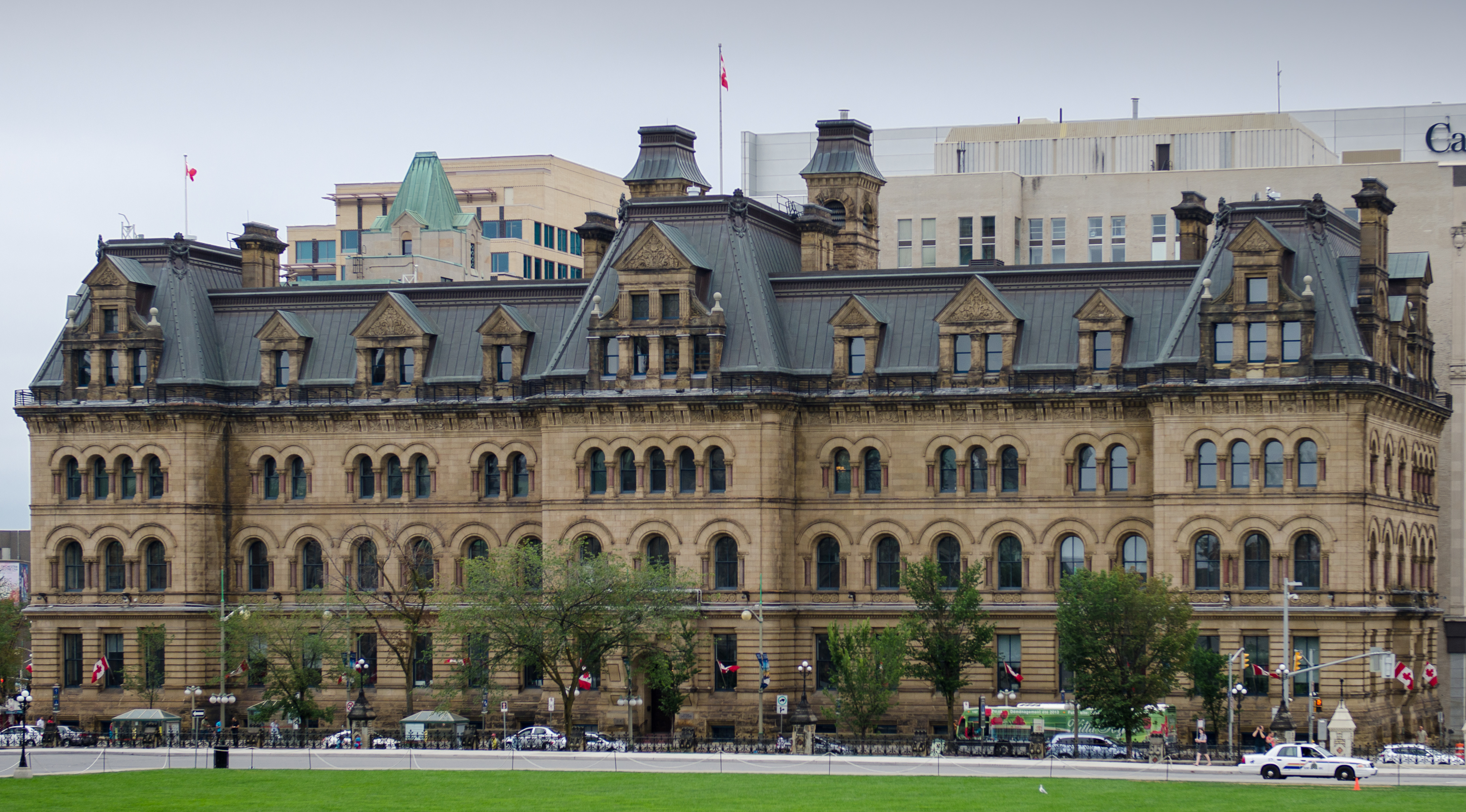
Office of the Prime Minister and Privy Council (formerly Langevin Block)

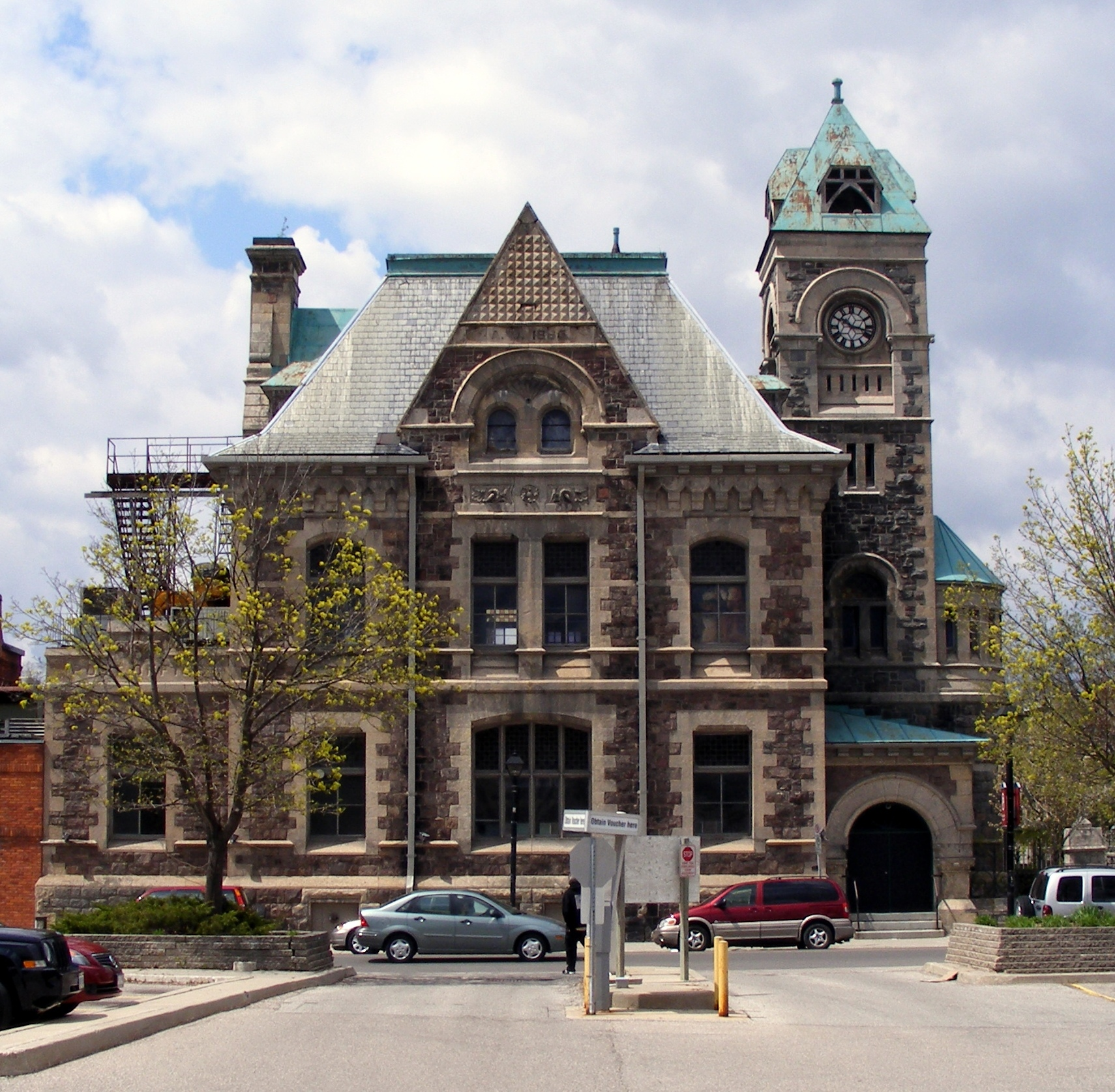
Old Galt Post Office Building

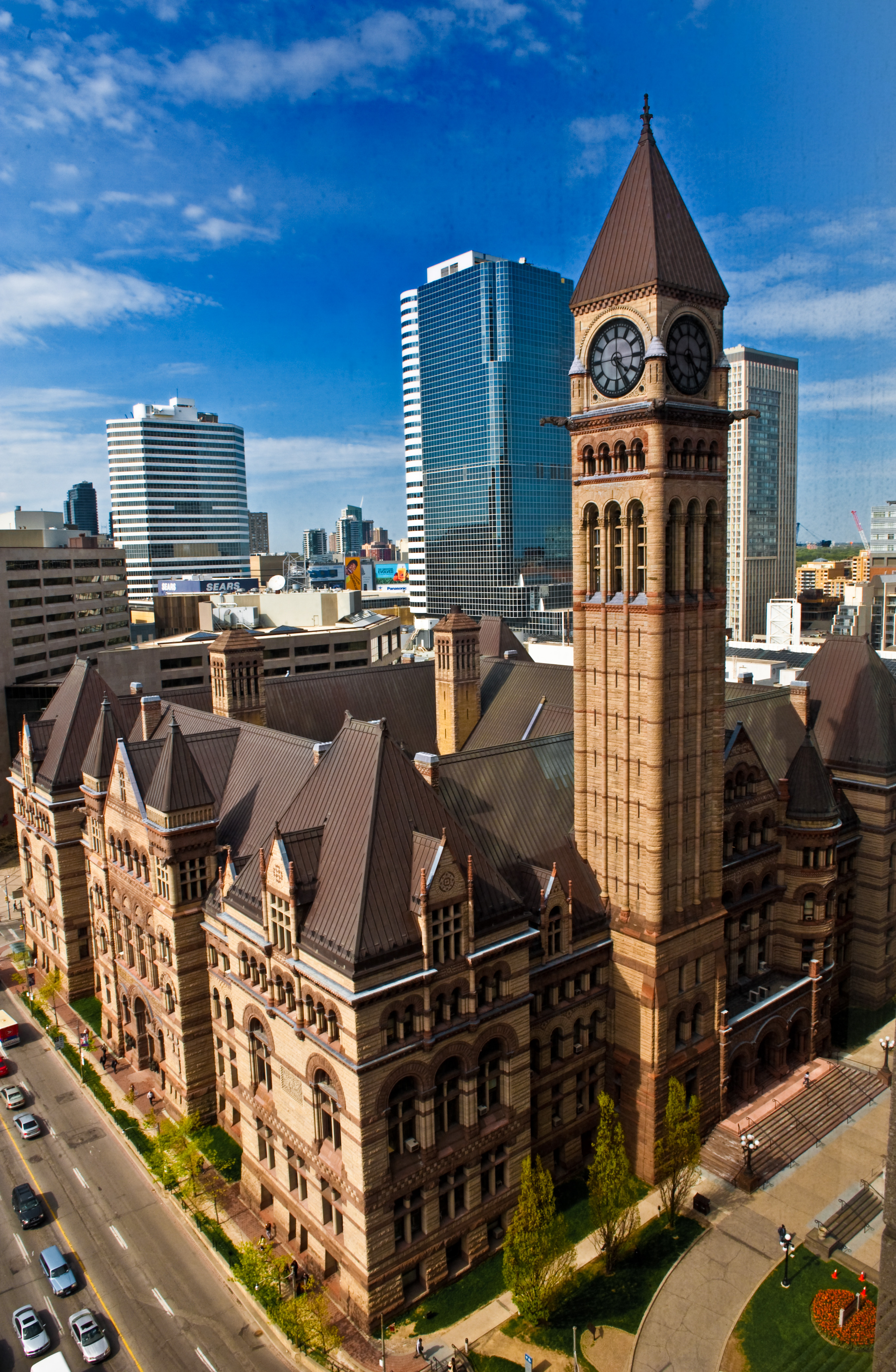
Old Toronto City Hall

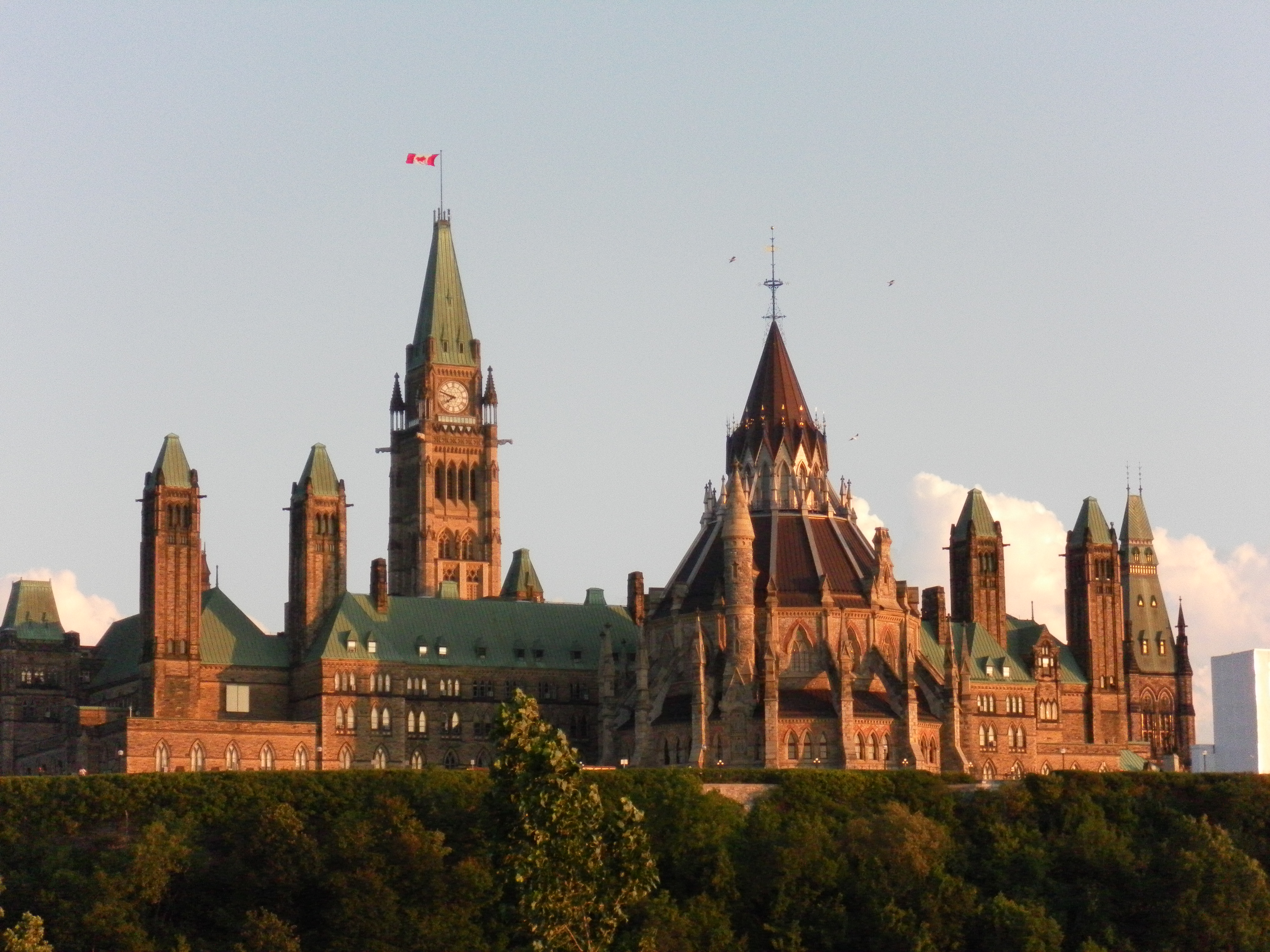
Parliament Buildings (Centre Block and Library)

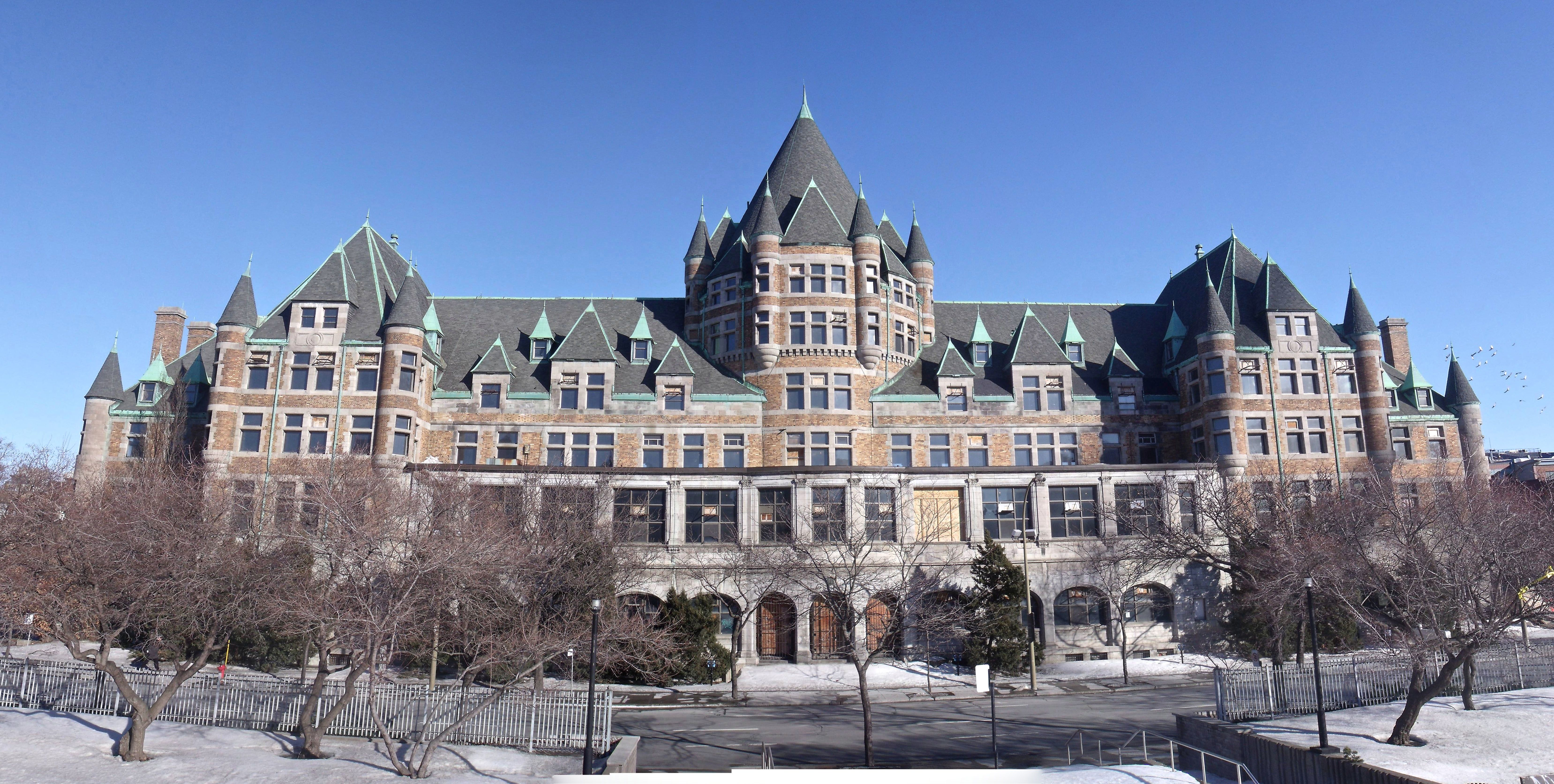
Place Viger

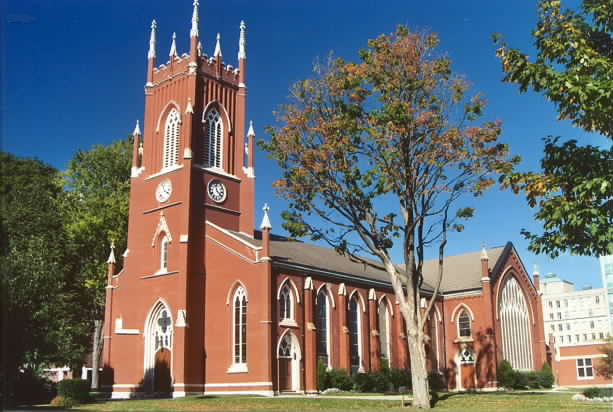
St. Paul's Cathedral (London, Ontario)

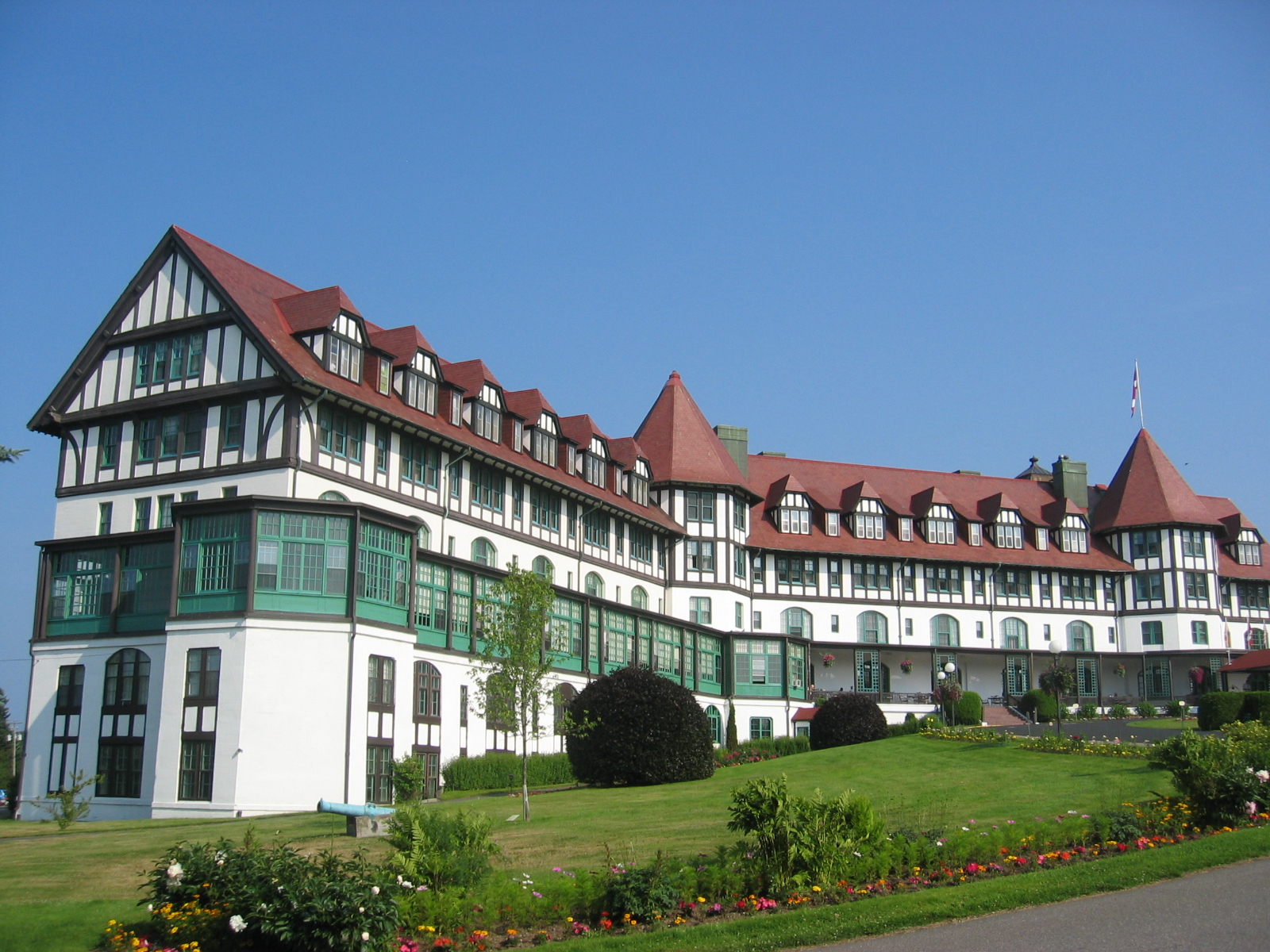
The Algonquin

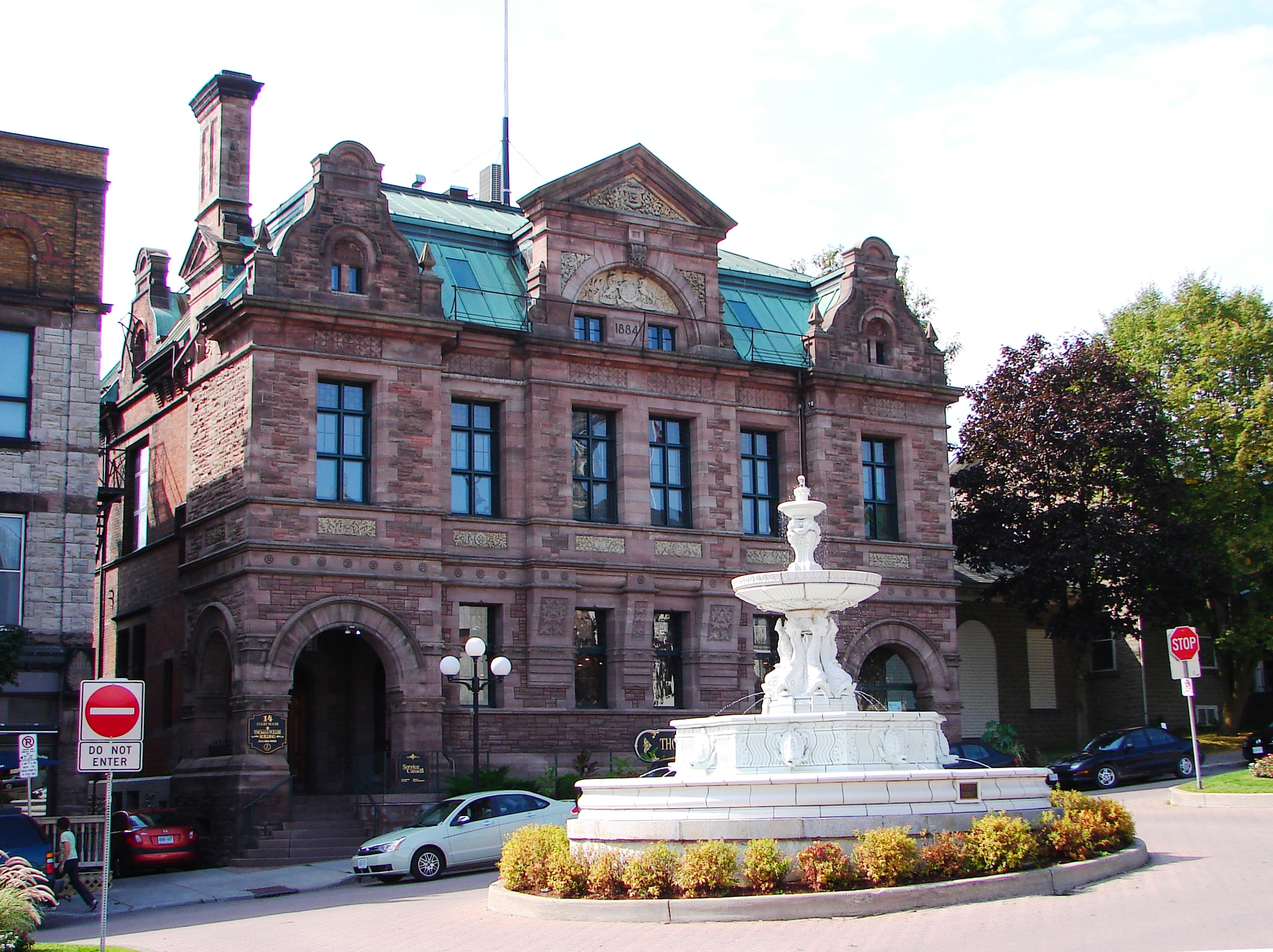
Thomas Fuller Building (Brockville, Ontario)

University College, Toronto Main Building

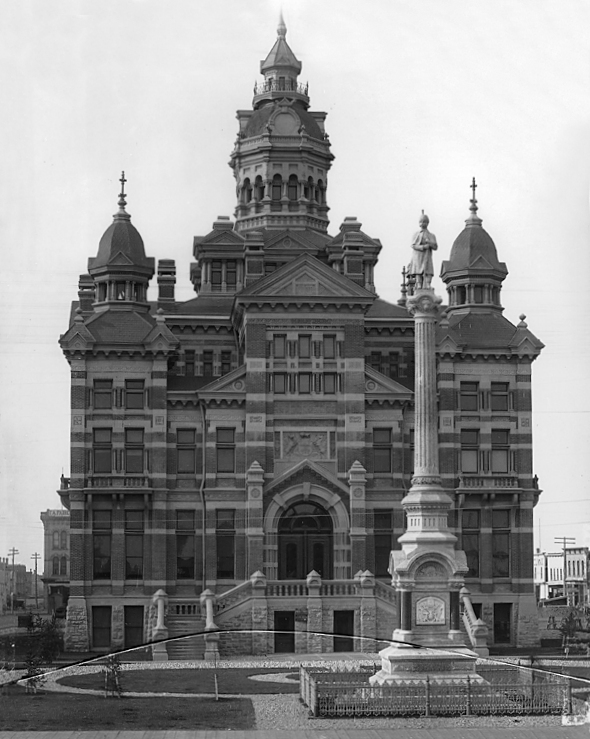
Winnipeg City Hall (1887)

=== India ===
Because India was a colony of Britain, Victorian Architecture is prevalent in India, especially in cities like Mumbai, Kolkata, Kerala and Chennai. In Mumbai (Formerly called Bombay) buildings like Chhatrapati Shivaji Terminus, Municipal Corporation Building, Bombay University, Bombay High Court, Asiatic Society of Mumbai Building (Former Town Hall) and the David Sasoon Library are some examples of Victorian Architecture in Mumbai. In Kolkata (Formerly called Calcutta) buildings like the Victoria Memorial, Calcutta High Court, St Paul's Cathedral, Howrah railway station, The Asiatic Society of Bengal are some examples of Victorian Architecture in Kolkata. In Chennai (Formerly called Madras) some examples include Madras High court, State Bank of Madras, Chennai Central railway station and St. Mary's Church. Many churches and colleges such as Santa Cruz Cathedral Basilica Kochi, University College Trivandrum, Government College of Fine Arts Trivandrum, Napier Museum, State Central Library of Kerala, Government Victoria College Palakkad, CMS College Kottayam and SB College Changanasserry are some of finest examples of Victorian architecture in Kerala.

== Preservation ==
Efforts to preserve landmarks of Victorian architecture are ongoing and are often led by the Victorian Society. A recent campaign the group has taken on is the preservation of Victorian gasometers after utility companies announced plans to demolish nearly 200 of the now-outdated structures.

== See also ==
- Victorian decorative arts
- Victorian house
- Victorian restoration
- Folk Victorian
- Albert Levy (photographer)
- Georgian architecture

== References and sources ==
=== Sources ===
- Apperly, Richard; Irving, Robert; Reynolds, Peter L. (1994). A Pictorial Guide to Identifying Australian Architecture: Styles and Terms from 1788 to the Present. Angus & Robertson. ISBN 978-0-207-18562-5.
- Dixon, Roger; Muthesius, Stefan (1978). Victorian Architecture: With a Short Dictionary of Architects and 251 Illustrations. Thames and Hudson. ISBN 978-0-500-18163-8.
- Lewis, Arnold (1975). American Victorian architecture: a survey of the 70's and 80's in contemporary photographs. Dover Publications. ISBN 978-0-486-23177-8.
- Prentice, Helaine K. (1986). Rehab Right. Ten Speed Press. ISBN 978-0-89815-172-5., includes descriptions of different Victorian and early-20th-century architectural styles common in the San Francisco Bay Area, particularly Oakland, and detailed instructions for repair and restoration of details common to older house styles.
