= Stephen Decatur Button =

American architect

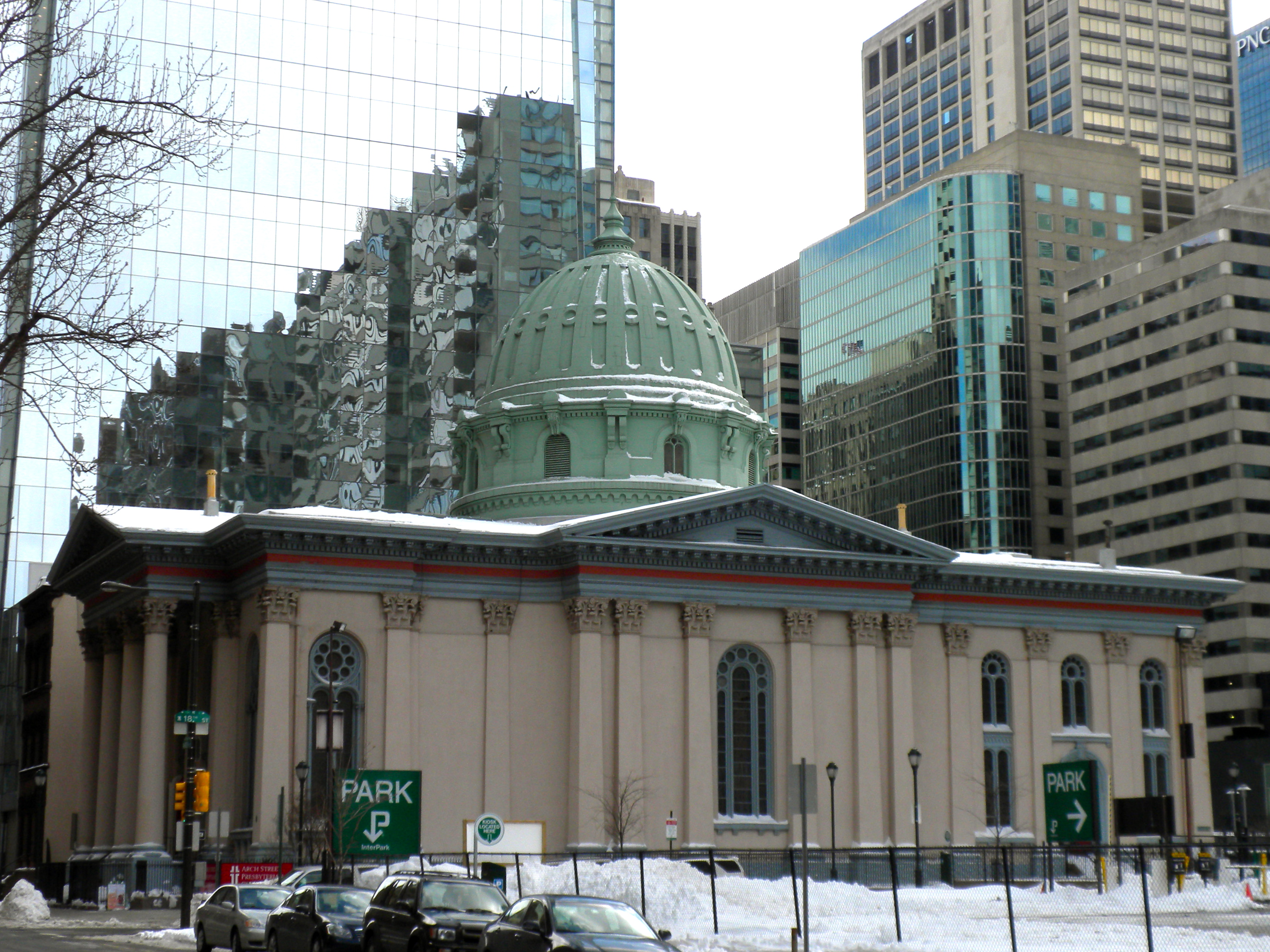
Arch Street Presbyterian Church, Philadelphia, Pennsylvania (1855).

Stephen Decatur Button (June 15, 1813 – January 7, 1897) was an American architect and a pioneer in the use of metal-frame construction for masonry buildings. He designed commercial buildings, schools and churches in Philadelphia, Pennsylvania, and Camden, New Jersey; and more than 30 buildings in Cape May, New Jersey.

== Career ==
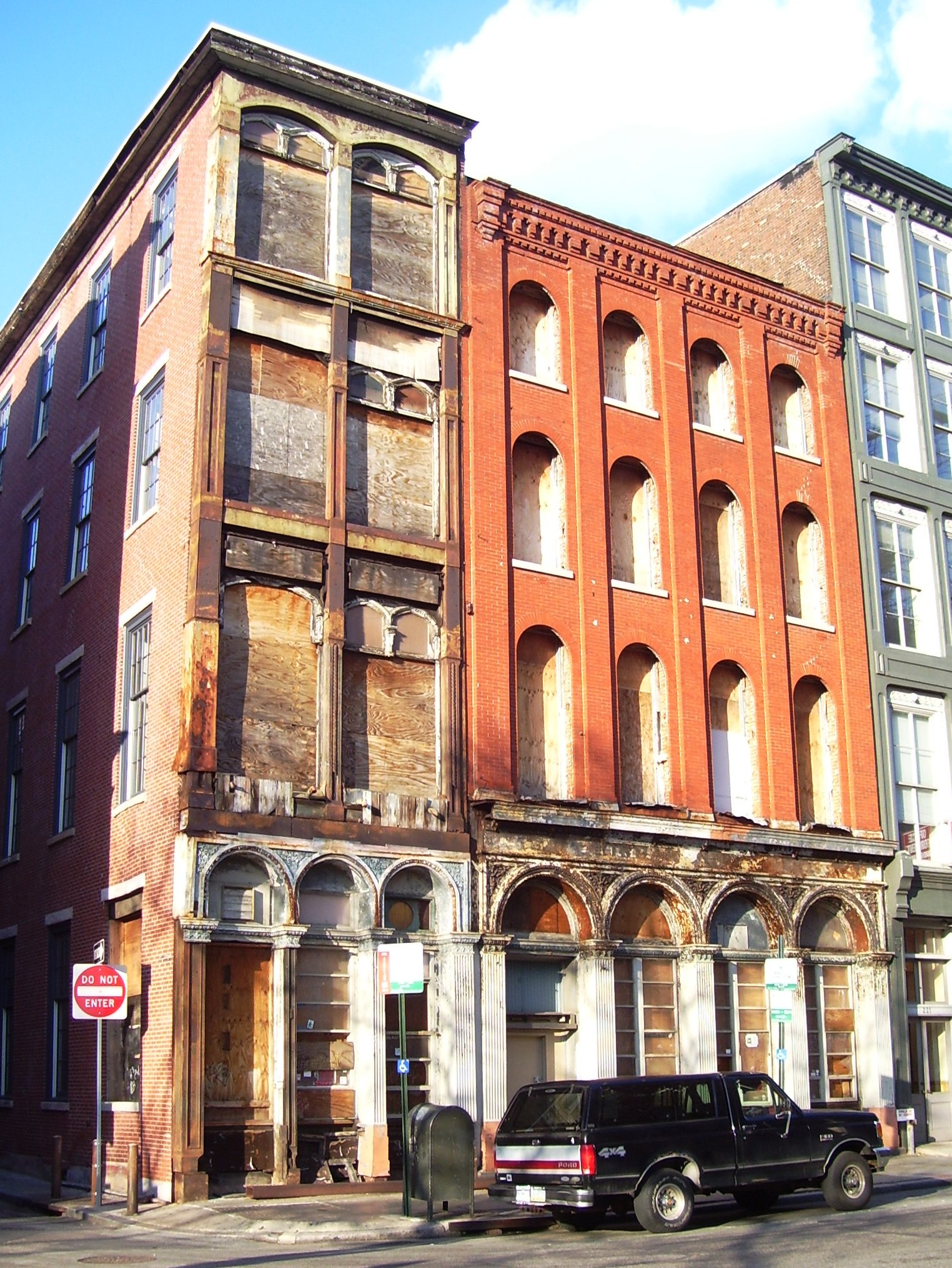
Lewis Building (center), and 243 Chestnut Street (left).

He apprenticed to his uncle, Connecticut carpenter Stephen Button, and became an assistant to New York City architect George Purvis. After running his own office in Hoboken, New Jersey, for a decade, he worked in Georgia and Florida in 1845 and 1846. In 1846, he won the competition to design the first Alabama State Capitol in Montgomery; his completed building burned on December 14, 1849. In 1848, he moved to Philadelphia and formed a partnership with his brother-in-law, Joseph C. Hoxie. The firm of Hoxie & Button lasted until 1852.

In his brick-and-iron Lewis Building at 239-41 Chestnut Street in Philadelphia (1852), "Button ... stripped the wall of excessive ornament and designed thin piers and wide voids to open the wall to light. To indicate a skeletal framework, the spandrels were recessed to emphasize the continuous upward flow of the plain piers." In 1961, architectural historian Winston Weisman labeled this style "Philadelphia Functionalism," and conjectured that it may have influenced the skyscrapers of architect Louis Sullivan. Sullivan worked next-door at 243 Chestnut Street in 1874, while a draftsman in the offices of architects Frank Furness & George W. Hewitt.

In addition to this modernist work, Button designed in the Romanesque and Italianate styles.

About 1854, he moved across the Delaware River to Camden, New Jersey, where he would live for the rest of his life. His house at 330 Mickle Street was next door to that of the poet Walt Whitman.

Button received major commissions in Camden, including churches, schools, railroad stations, commercial buildings, and the second City Hall. After much of Cape May, New Jersey, was destroyed in an 1878 fire, Button rebuilt several of its resort hotels in brick and designed dozens of residences there.

== Selected works ==
=== Philadelphia ===
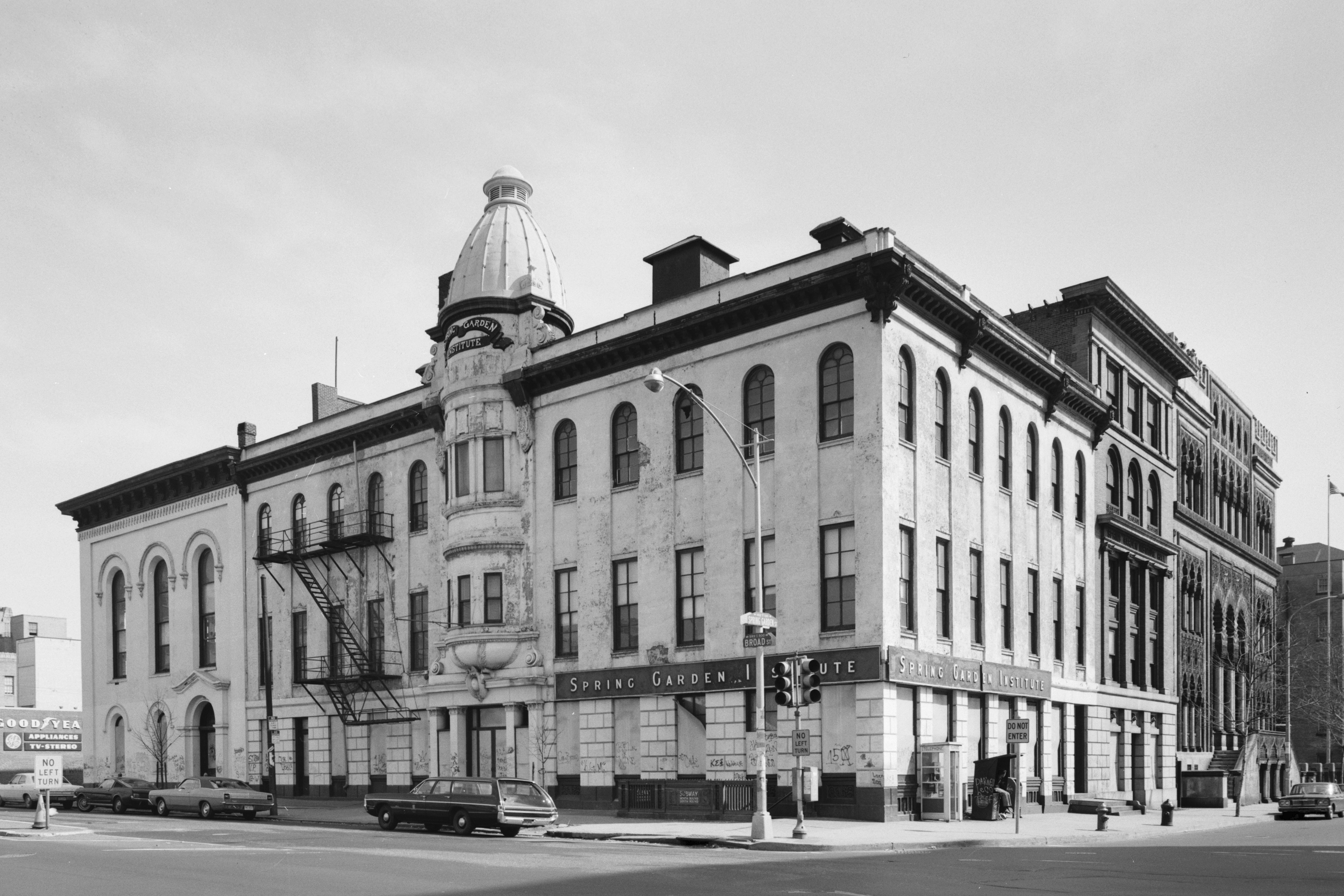
Spring Garden Institute

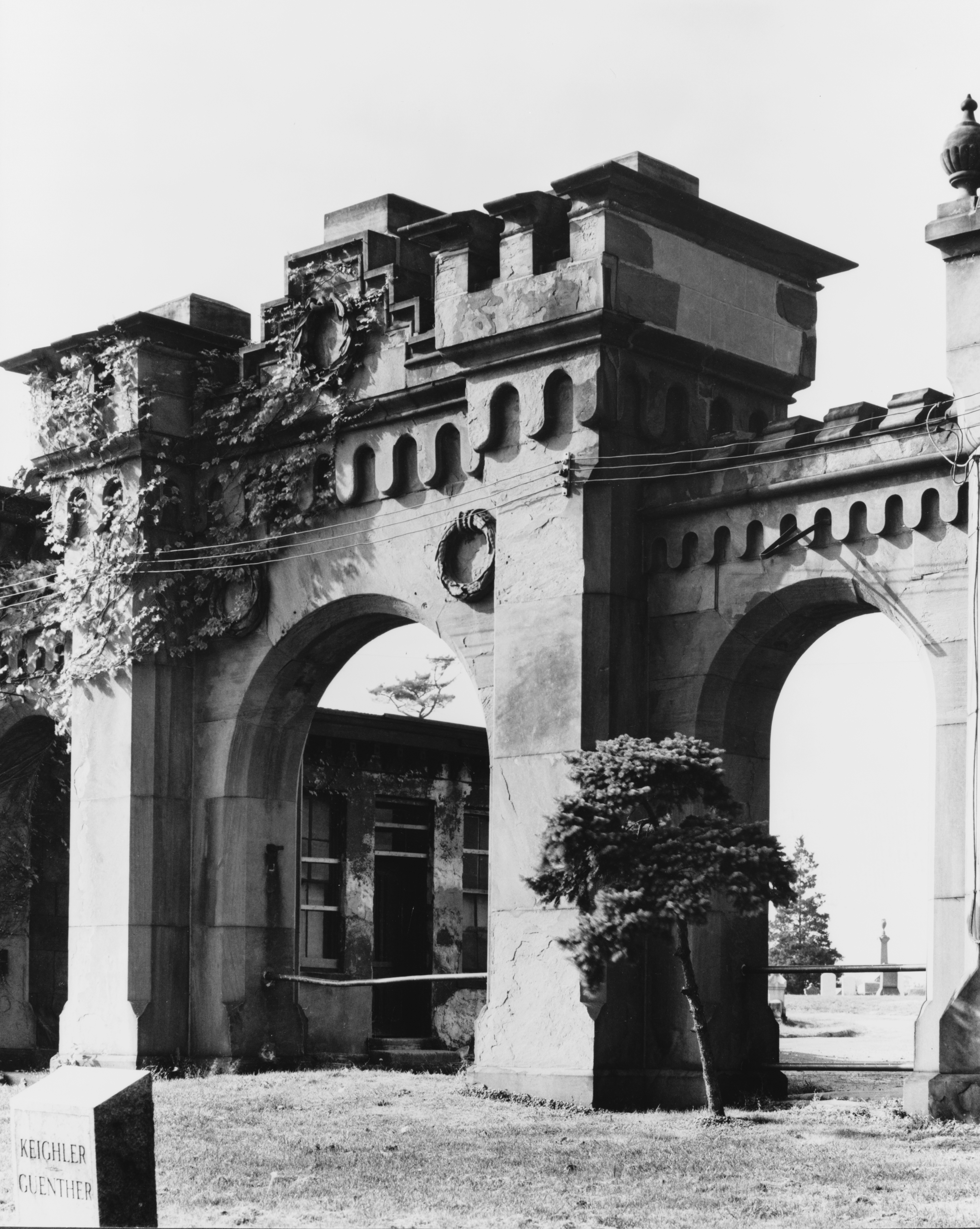
Mount Moriah Cemetery Gatehouse

- Odd Fellows Cemetery Gatehouse, 24th & Diamond Streets, Philadelphia, Pennsylvania (circa 1849, demolished circa 1951).
- Spring Garden Institute, 523-25 North Broad Street, Philadelphia, Pennsylvania (1851–52), torn down 1972.
- Lewis Building, 239-41 Chestnut Street, Philadelphia, Pennsylvania (1852).
- Second Dutch Reformed Church, 817 North 7th Street, Philadelphia, Pennsylvania (1852–54). In 1917, this became St. Nicholas Russian Orthodox Church.
- Gaul-Forrest House, 1326-36 North Broad Street, Philadelphia, Pennsylvania (1853–54), attributed to Button.
- First Baptist Church, Broad & Arch Streets, Philadelphia, Pennsylvania (1853–56, demolished 1898).
- First Dutch Reformed Church, 7th & Spring Garden Streets, Philadelphia, Pennsylvania (1853–55).
- Arch Street Presbyterian Church, 1726-32 Arch Street, Philadelphia, Pennsylvania (1855), Hoxie & Button.
- Mount Moriah Cemetery Gatehouse, 6299 Kingsessing Avenue, Philadelphia, Pennsylvania (1855).
- Leland Building, 37-39 South 3rd Street, Philadelphia, Pennsylvania (1855).
- Joseph H. Schenck Building, 535 Arch Street, Philadelphia, Pennsylvania (1869–72, partially demolished 1938, demolished 1959).

=== Camden, New Jersey ===
- Second Presbyterian Church, 416 South 4th Street, Camden, New Jersey (1865–66).
- First Presbyterian Church, 5th & Penn Streets, Camden, New Jersey (1871–73).
- (Second) Camden City Hall, Haddon Avenue & Benson Street, Camden, New Jersey (1874–75, demolished 1930).
- Richard Fetters School, 3rd & Walnut Streets, Camden, New Jersey (1875). A boys grammar school diagonally opposite the Mulford School.
- Isaac S. Mulford School, 3rd & Walnut Streets., Camden, New Jersey (1875, demolished post-1956). A girls grammar school diagonally opposite the Fetters School.
- John W. Mickle School, 6th & Van Hook Streets, Camden, New Jersey (1875–76, demolished 1971).

=== Cape May, New Jersey ===
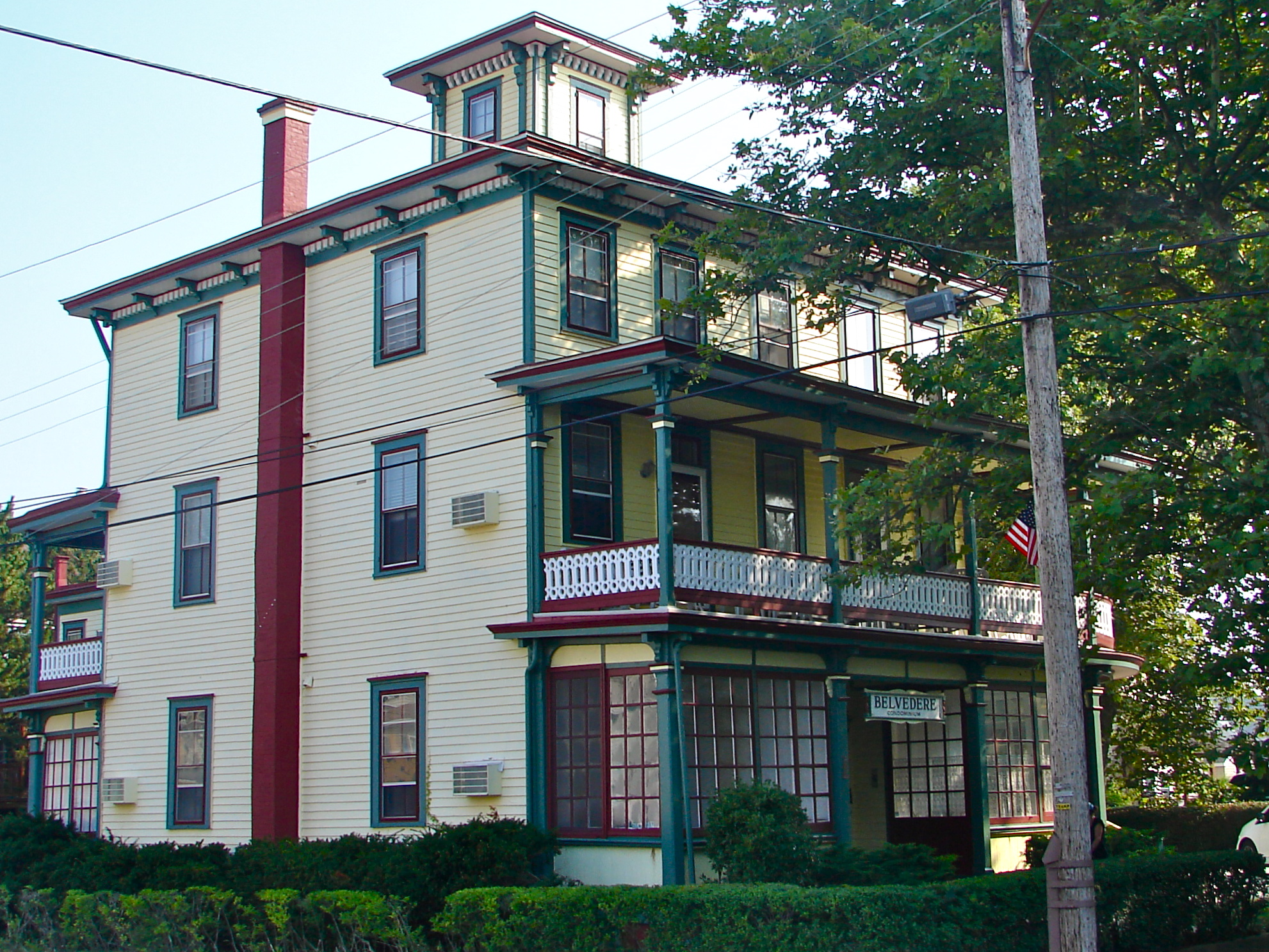
The "Belevedere" bed and breakfast at 101 S. LaFayette Street in Cape May near the corner with Windsor, part of the Cape May Historic District

- Stockton Hotel, Cape May, New Jersey (1868–69).
- John B. McCreary House, 34 Gurney Street, Cape May, New Jersey (1869–70).
- Jackson's Club House, 635 Columbia Avenue, Cape May, New Jersey (1872).
- Stockton Place Houses (row of 10 balloon-frame houses), 12-30 Gurney Street, Cape May, New Jersey (1871–72, 2 houses demolished).
- Expansion of Chalfonte Hotel, Howard & Sewell Streets, Cape May, New Jersey (1879).
- Congress Hall Hotel, 251 Beach Avenue, Cape May, New Jersey (1879). The previous Congress Hall Hotel burned in 1878.
- Windsor Hotel, Windsor Street & Beach Avenue, Cape May, New Jersey (1879, burned 1979).
- J. R. Evans House, 207 Congress Place, Cape May, New Jersey (1882–83).
- E. C. Knight House, 203 Congress Place, Cape May, New Jersey (1882–83).
- Atlantic Terrace Houses (row of 7 balloon-frame houses), Jackson Street, Cape May, New Jersey (1891–92).

=== Elsewhere ===
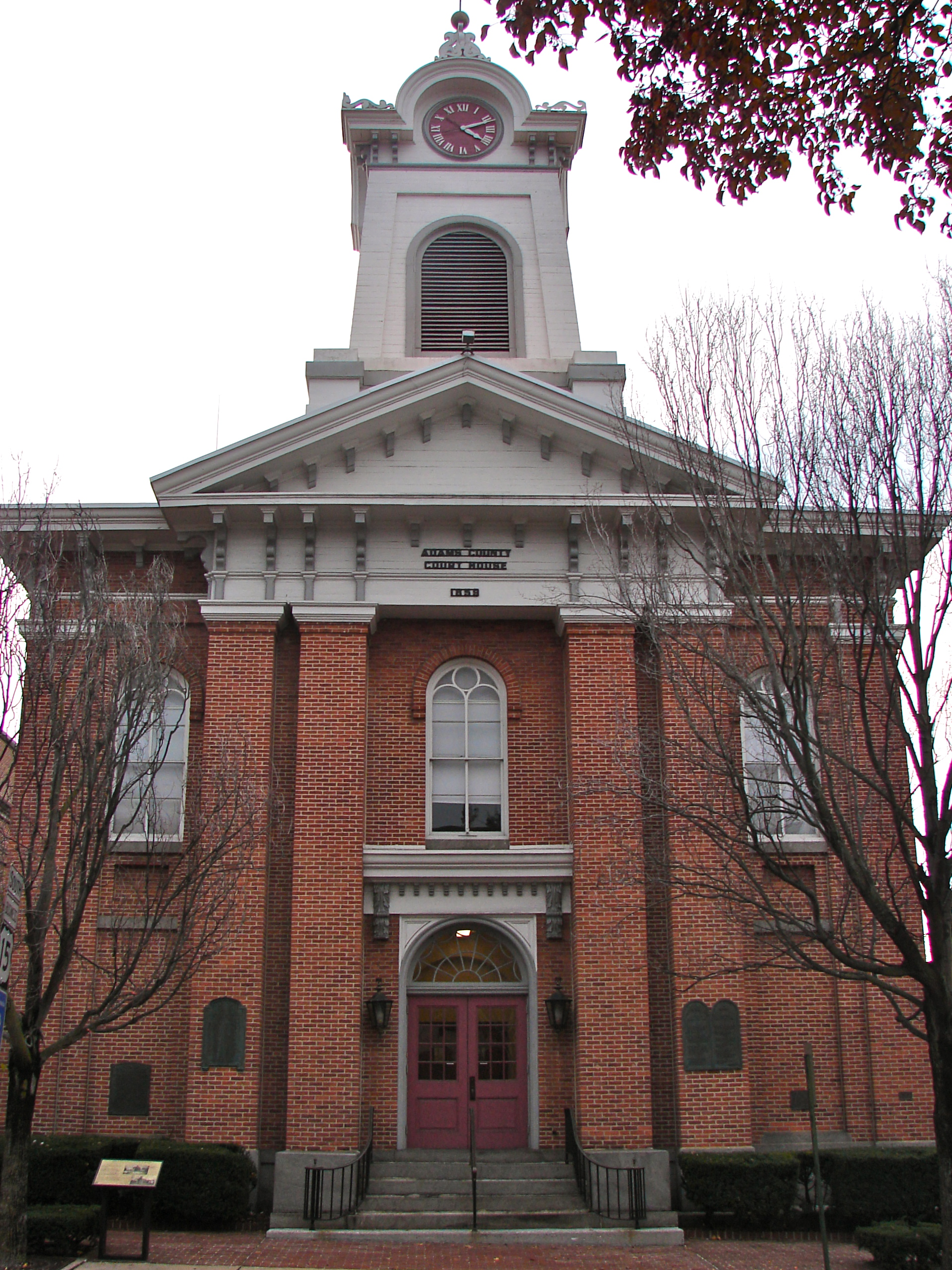
Adams County Courthouse

- (First) Alabama State Capitol, Montgomery, Alabama (1846–47, burned and demolished 1849).
- Knox Hall, 419 South Perry Street, Montgomery, Alabama (1848).
- Central Bank of Alabama, 1 Dexter Avenue, Montgomery, Alabama (1854). Now Alabama State Council on the Arts.
- Adams County Courthouse, Gettysburg, Pennsylvania (1858–59).
- Abram Minis House, 204 East Jones Street, Savannah, Georgia (1859–60).
- Alterations to Cargill House, 1316 3rd Avenue, Columbus, Georgia (circa 1860).
- Evergreen Cemetery gatehouse, Gettysburg, Pennsylvania (1855).

== Gallery ==
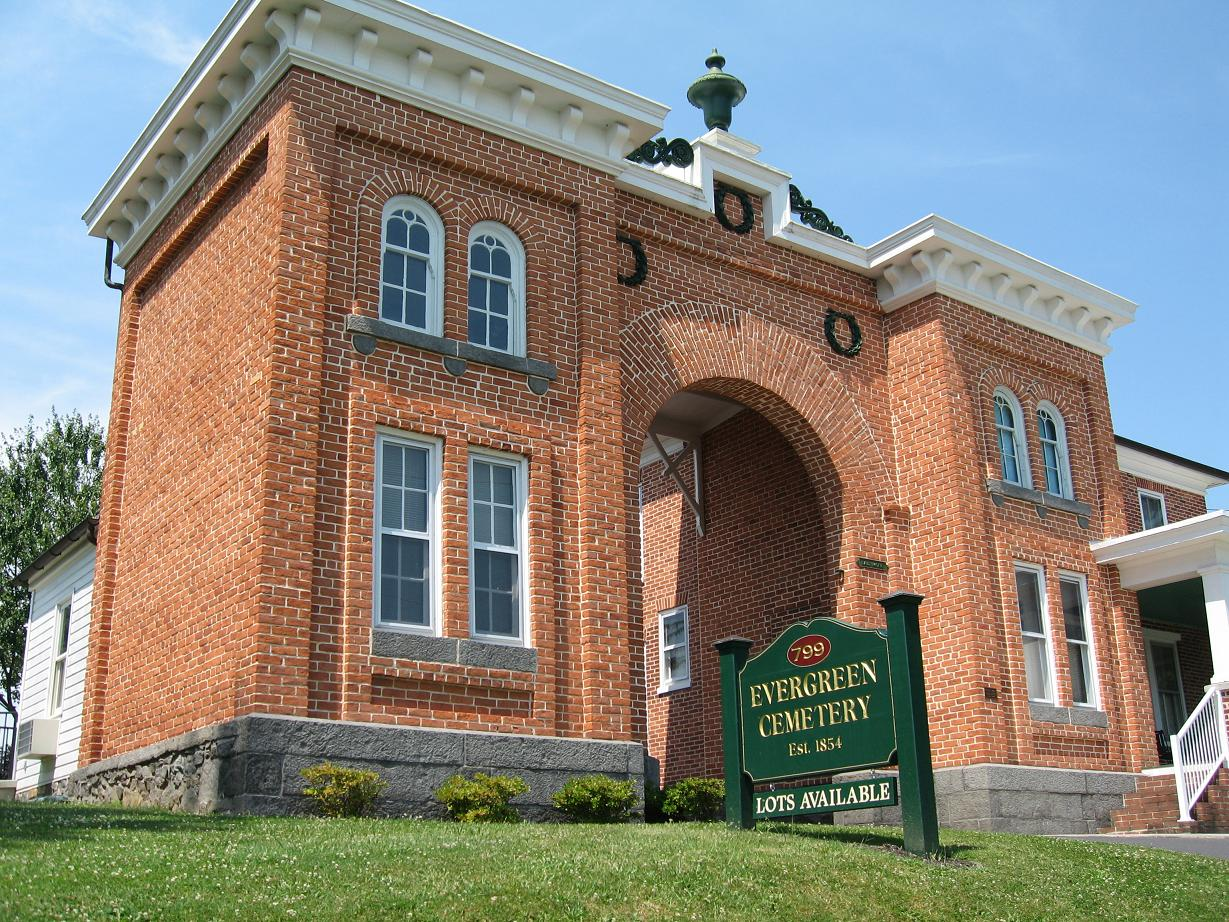
Evergreen Cemetery Gatehouse

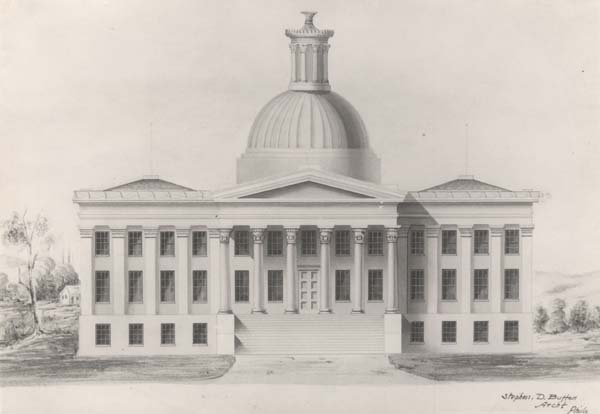
(First) Alabama State Capitol, Montgomery, Alabama (1846–47, burned 1849).

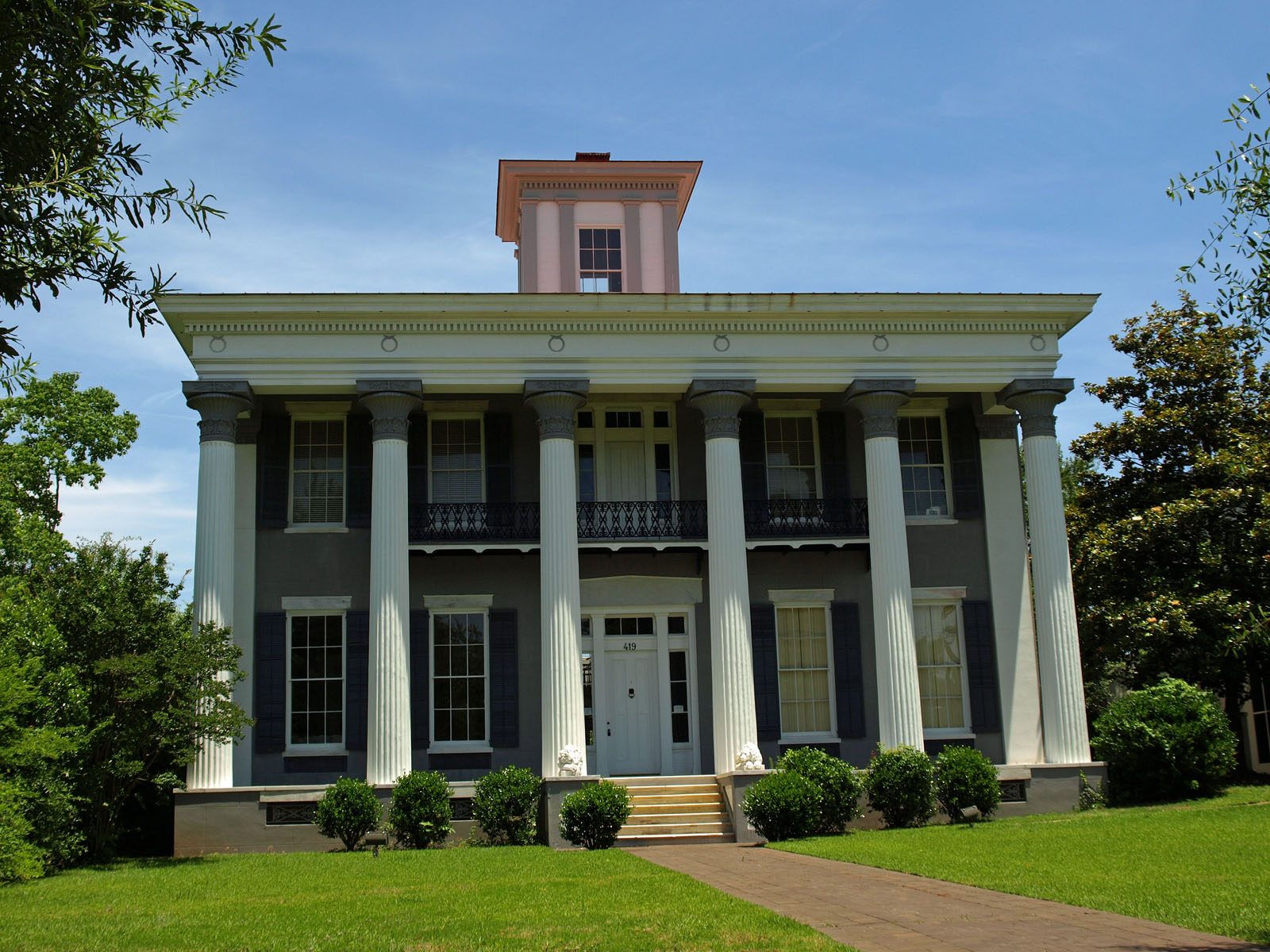
Knox Hall, Montgomery, Alabama (1848).

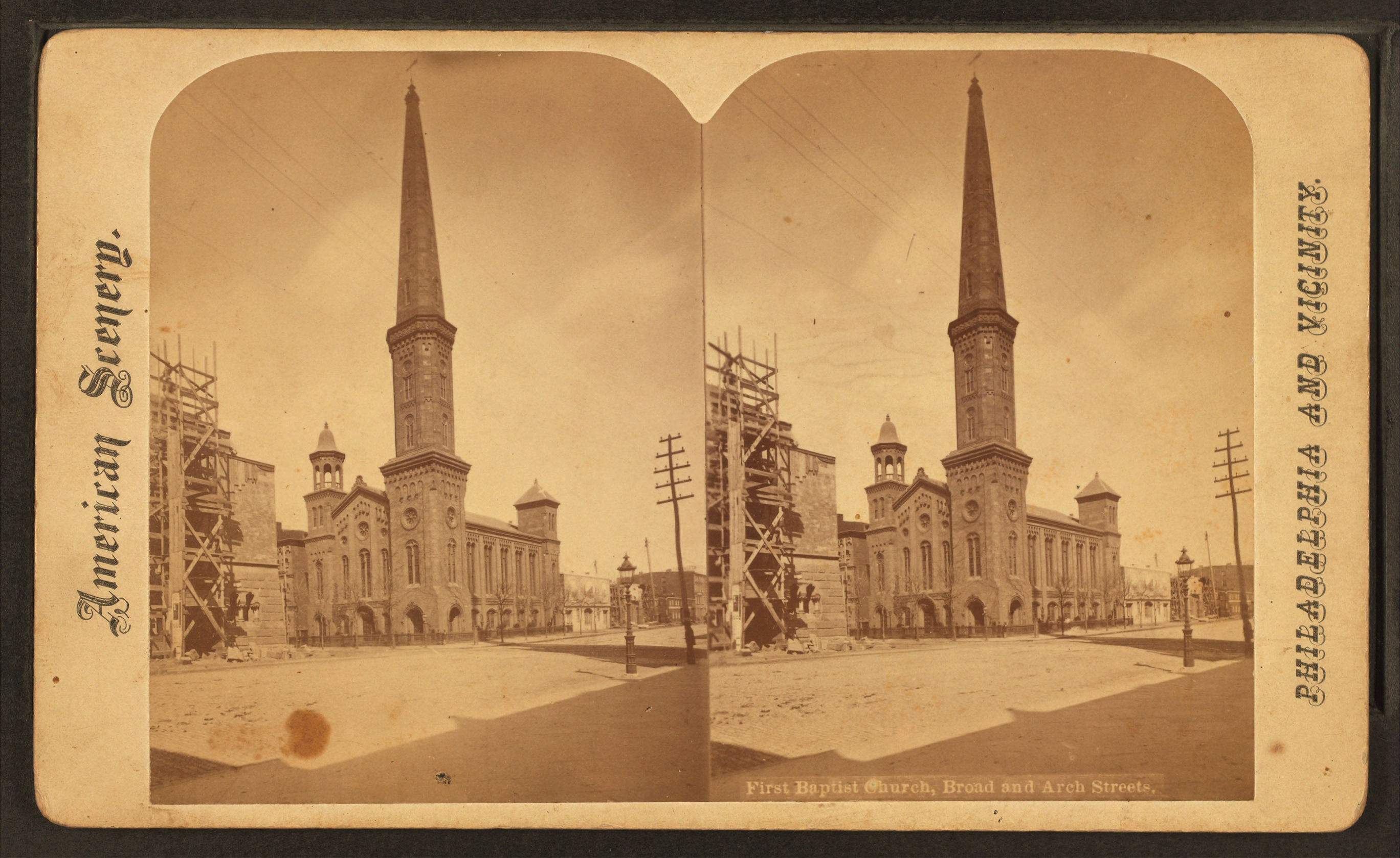
First Baptist Church, Philadelphia, Pennsylvania (1853–56, demolished 1898).

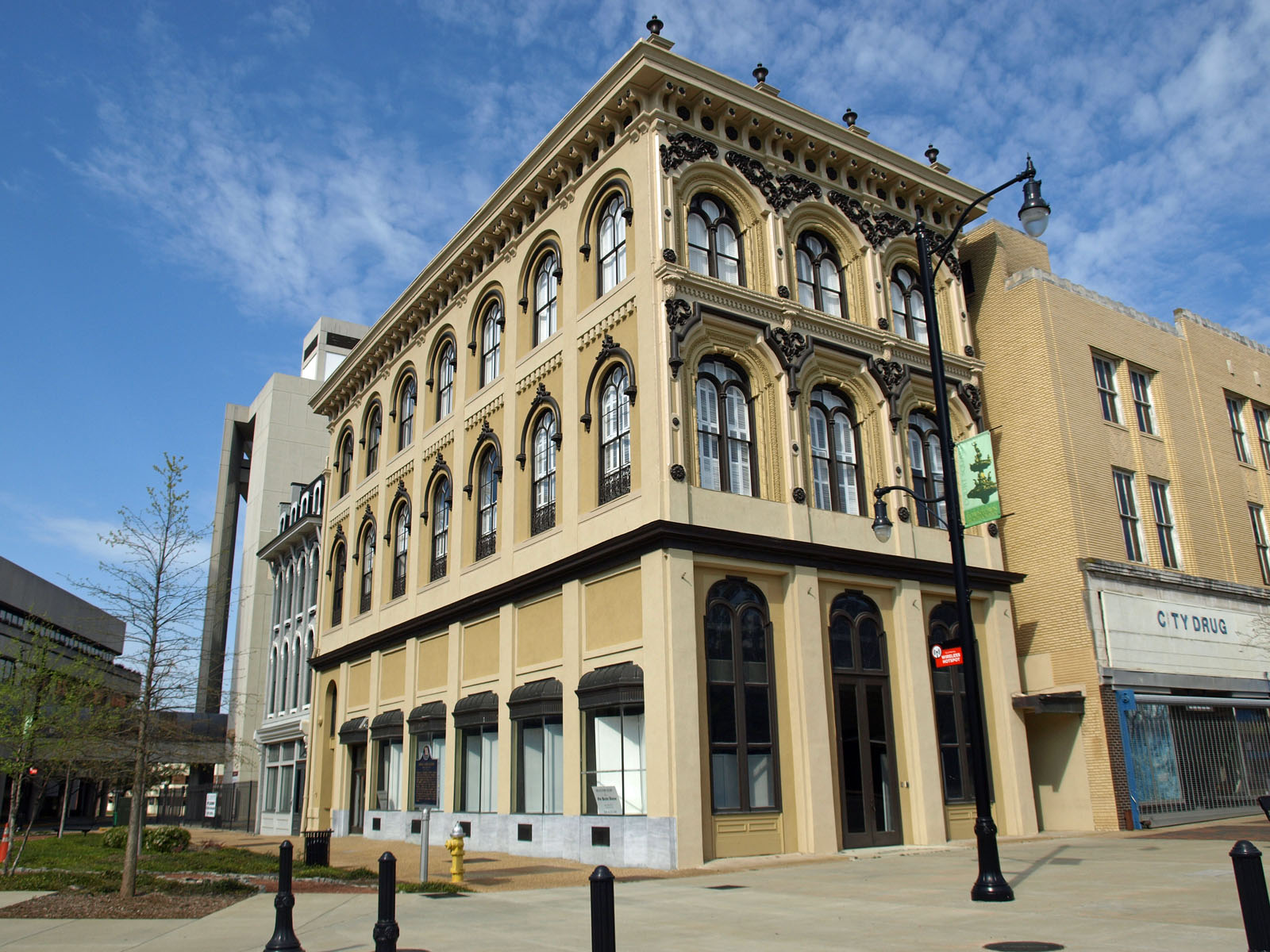
Central Bank of Alabama, Montgomery, Alabama (1854).

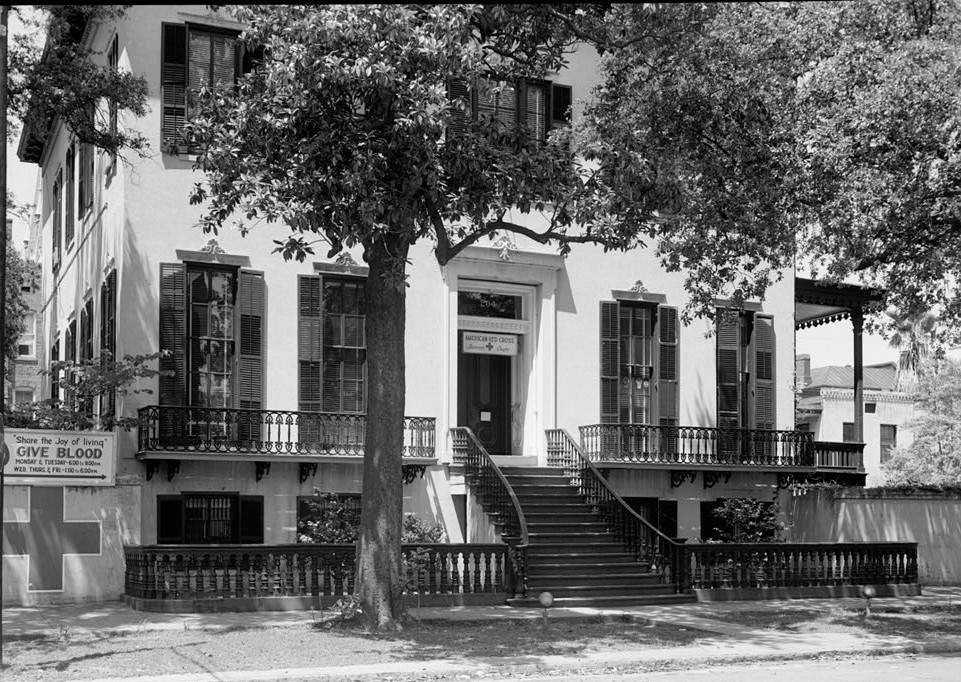
Abram Minis House, Savannah, Georgia (1859-1860).

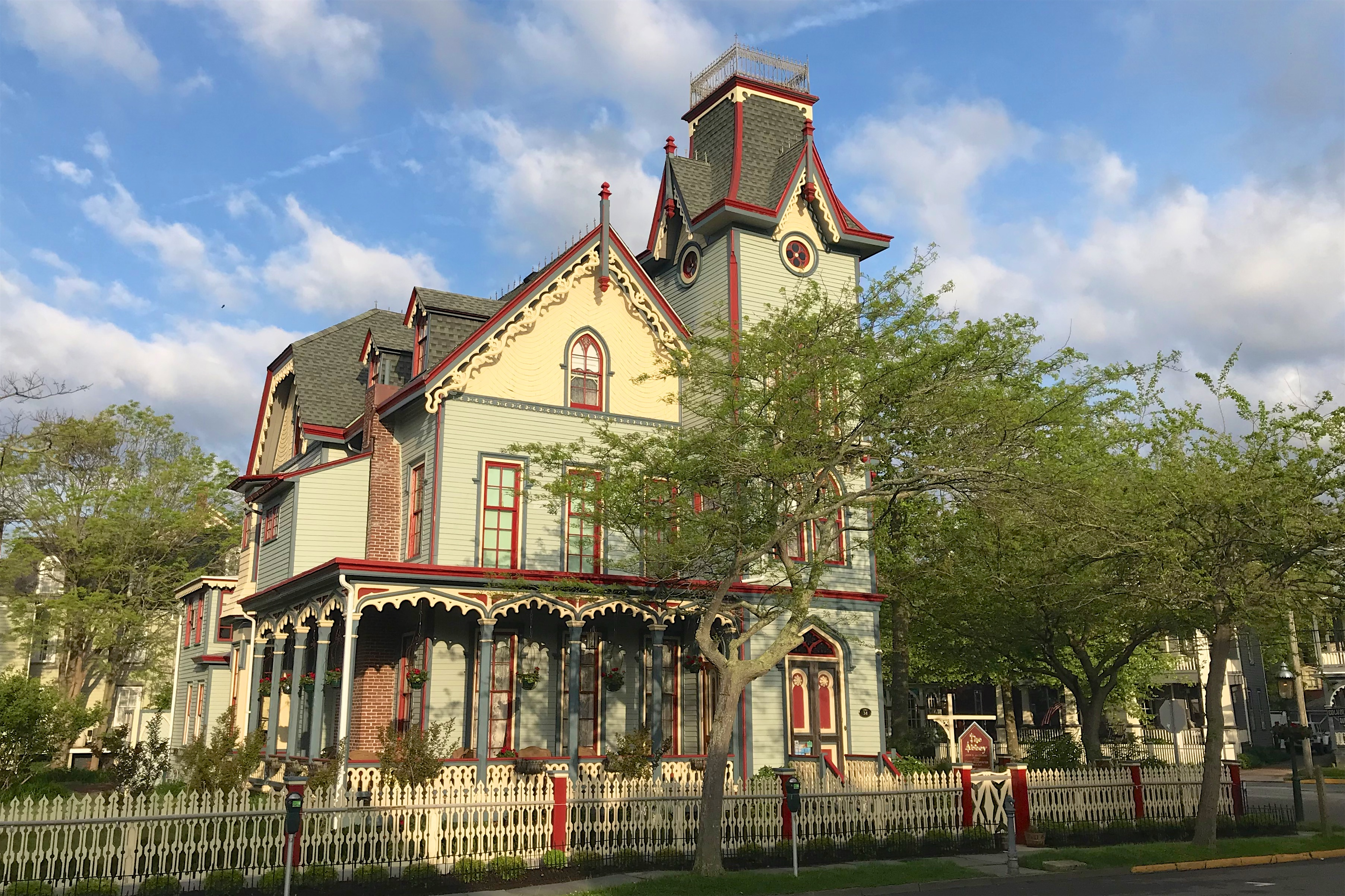
John B. McCreary House, Cape May, New Jersey (1869–70).

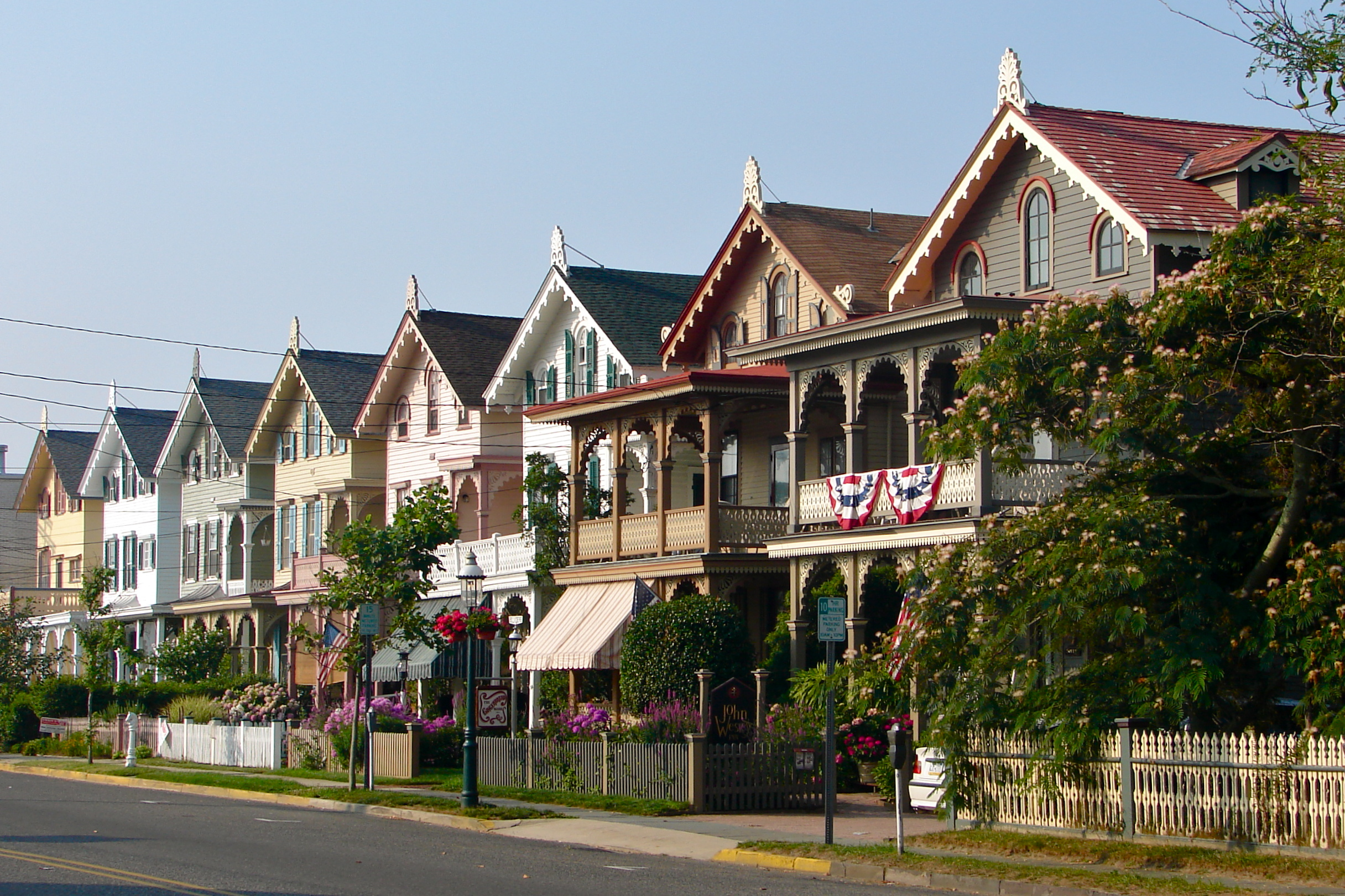
Stockton Place Houses, Cape May, New Jersey (1871–72).

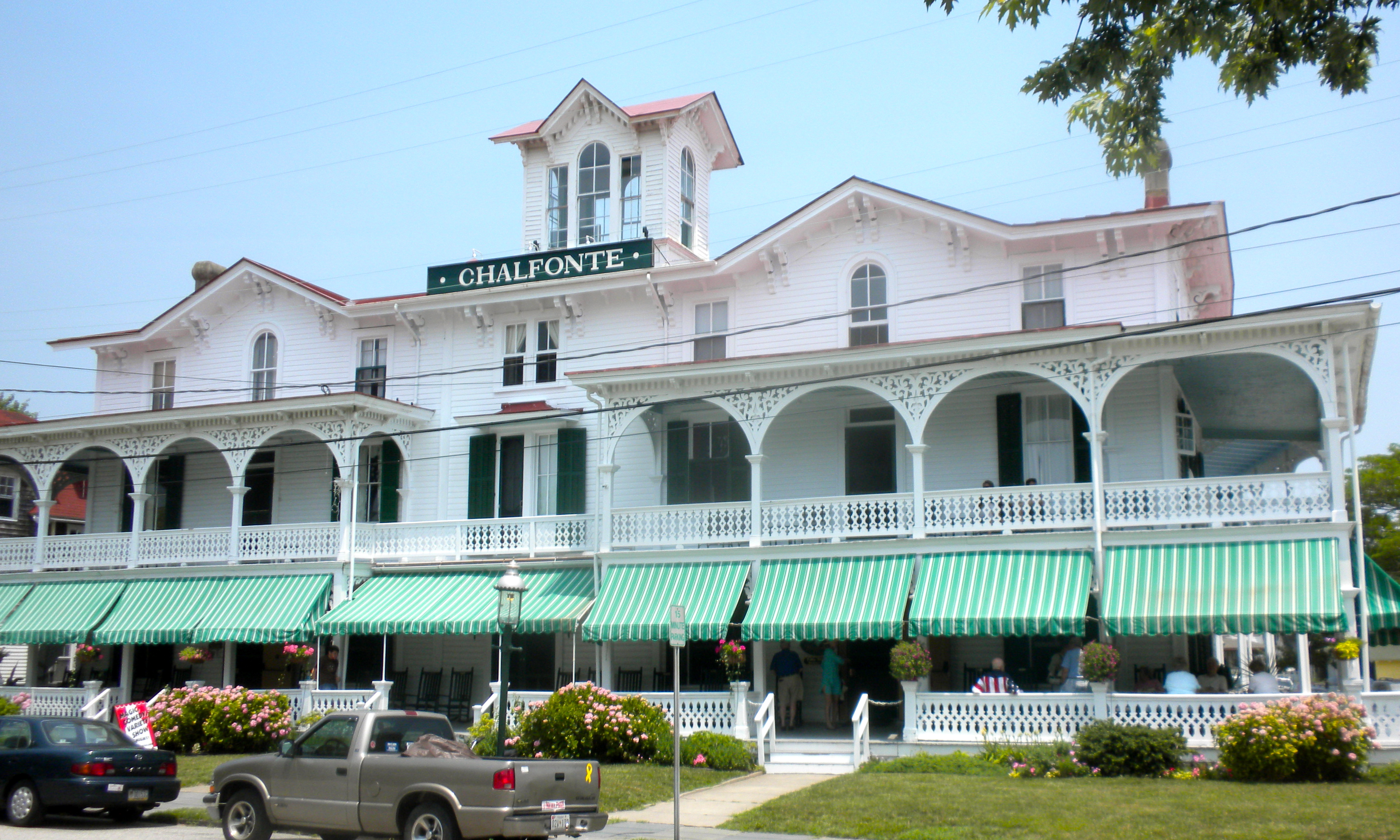
Expansion of Chalfonte Hotel, Cape May, New Jersey (1879).

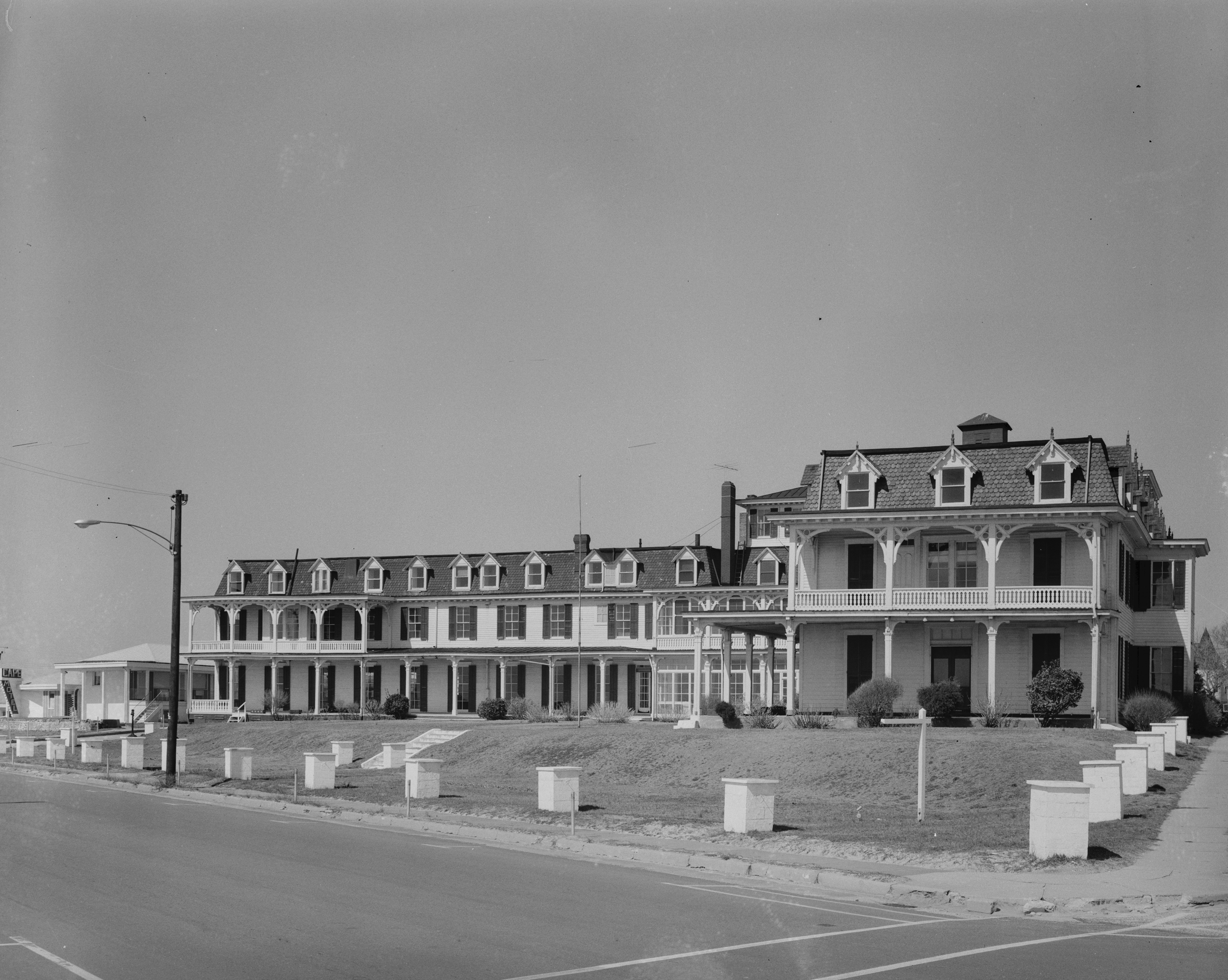
Windsor Hotel, Cape May, New Jersey (1879, burned 1979).

== See also ==
- Cape May Historic District
- National Register of Historic Places listings in Camden County, New Jersey
