= Odd Fellows Cemetery (Philadelphia) =

Cemetery in Pennsylvania, US

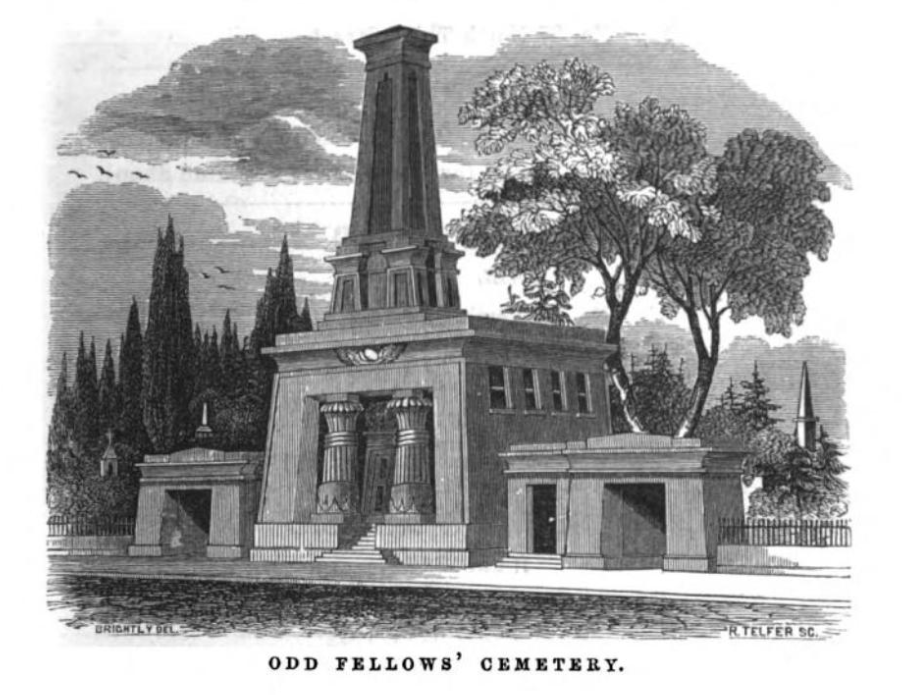
- Odd Fellows Cemetery entrance gate
- Interactive map of Odd Fellows Cemetery

Details
- Established: 1849
- Location: 24th and Diamond Streets, Philadelphia, Pennsylvania
- Country: United States
- Coordinates: 39.9867°N 75.1727°W
- Type: private
- Owned by: Odd Fellows
- Find a Grave: Odd Fellows Cemetery

Odd Fellows Cemetery was a 32 acre cemetery located North and South of Diamond Street and between 22nd and 25th Street in the North Philadelphia West neighborhood of Philadelphia, Pennsylvania. It was established in 1849 by the Odd Fellows fraternal organization for the burial of their members. The eighty-one foot high, brown stone, Egyptian Revival gatehouse was designed by architects Stephen Decatur Button and Joseph C. Hoxie.

The Odd Fellows Cemetery was located a short distance from Old Glenwood Cemetery and adjoined the smaller United American Mechanics' Cemetery.

The cemetery was a part of the United States National Cemetery System during the American Civil War with a leased lot within the cemetery for 277 soldiers that died in nearby hospitals. The soldiers' remains were reinterred to the Philadelphia National Cemetery in 1885.

In 1951, the cemetery property was acquired by the Philadelphia Housing Authority for construction of the Raymond Rosen housing project. The bodies were moved to two other cemeteries owned by the Odd Fellows – Mount Peace Cemetery in Philadelphia and Lawnview Memorial Park in Rockledge, Pennsylvania. However, in 2013, workers unearthed 28 graves and remains that were not moved and were still under the playground of the William Dick school built in 1954.

== Notable burials ==
- Manuel Azadigian (1901–1924), painter and sculptor
- Peter Cross (1815–1862), U.S. Mint assistant engraver
- Charles Kochersperger (1826–1867), Union Army officer
- George Lippard (1822–1854), Novelist, journalist, playwright, social activist and labor organizer The Lippard grave and memorial were moved to Lawnview in 1951.
- John Francis Staunton (1821–1875), Union Army Colonel
