= Cape May Historic District =

Historic district in New Jersey, United States

- U.S. National Register of Historic Places
- U.S. National Historic Landmark District
- New Jersey Register of Historic Places
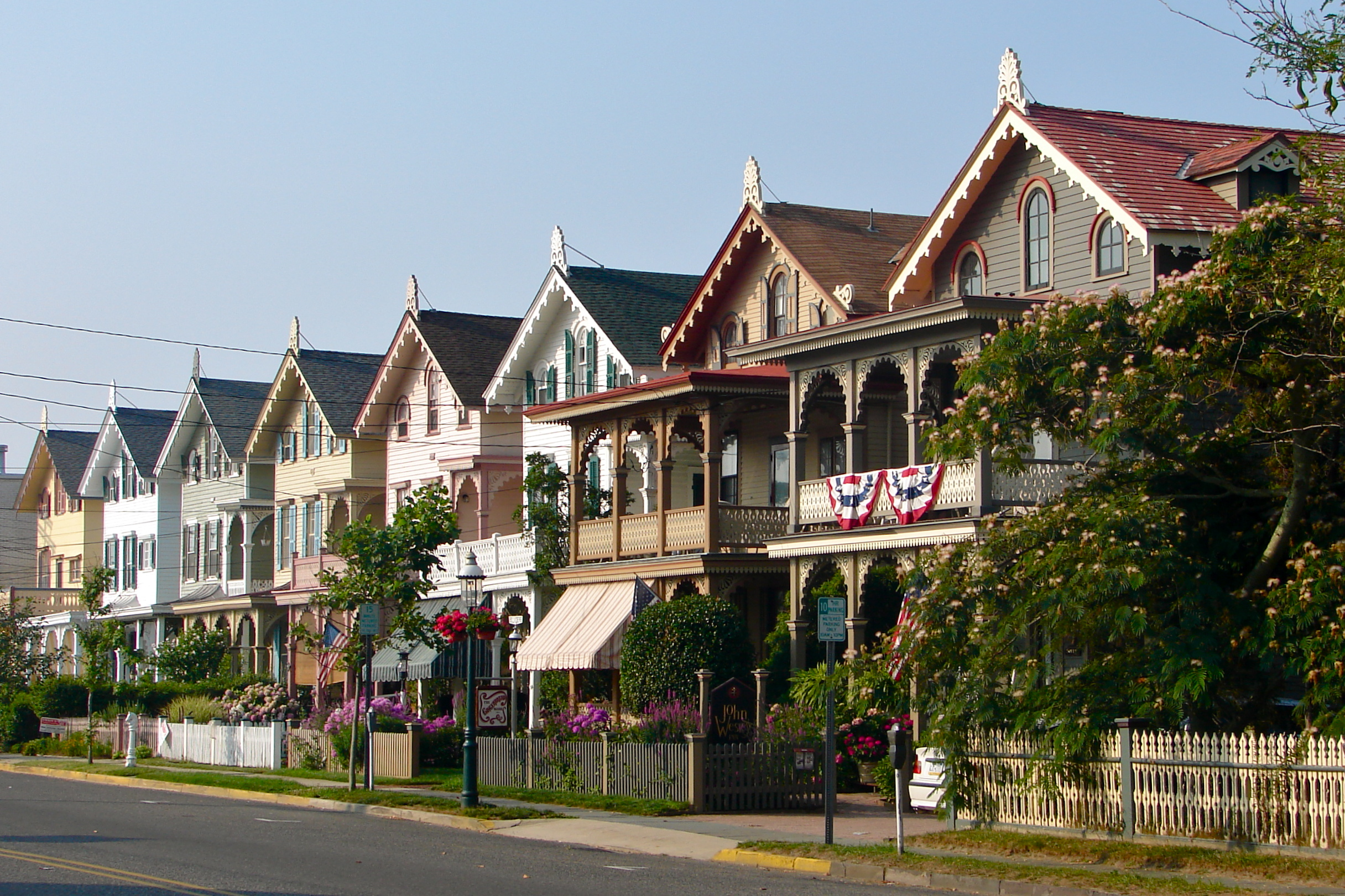
- Stockton Cottages

- Location within Cape May County, New Jersey Location within New Jersey Location within the United States
- Location: Cape May, New Jersey
- Coordinates: 38°56′24″N 74°54′46″W
- Area: 380 acres (1.5 km^{2})
- Built: 1850
- Architectural style: Late Victorian
- NRHP reference No.: 70000383
- NJRHP No.: 3042

Significant dates
- Added to NRHP: December 29, 1970
- Designated NHLD: May 11, 1976
- Designated NJRHP: December 10, 1970

The Cape May Historic District is an area of 380 acres (1.5 km^{2}) with over 600 buildings in the resort town of Cape May, Cape May County, New Jersey. The city claims to be America's first seaside resort and has numerous buildings in the Late Victorian style, including the Eclectic, Stick, and Shingle styles, as well as the later Bungalow style, many with gingerbread trim. According to National Park Service architectural historian Carolyn Pitts, "Cape May has one of the largest collections of late 19th century frame buildings left in the United States... that give it a homogeneous architectural character, a kind of textbook of vernacular American building."

== Geography ==
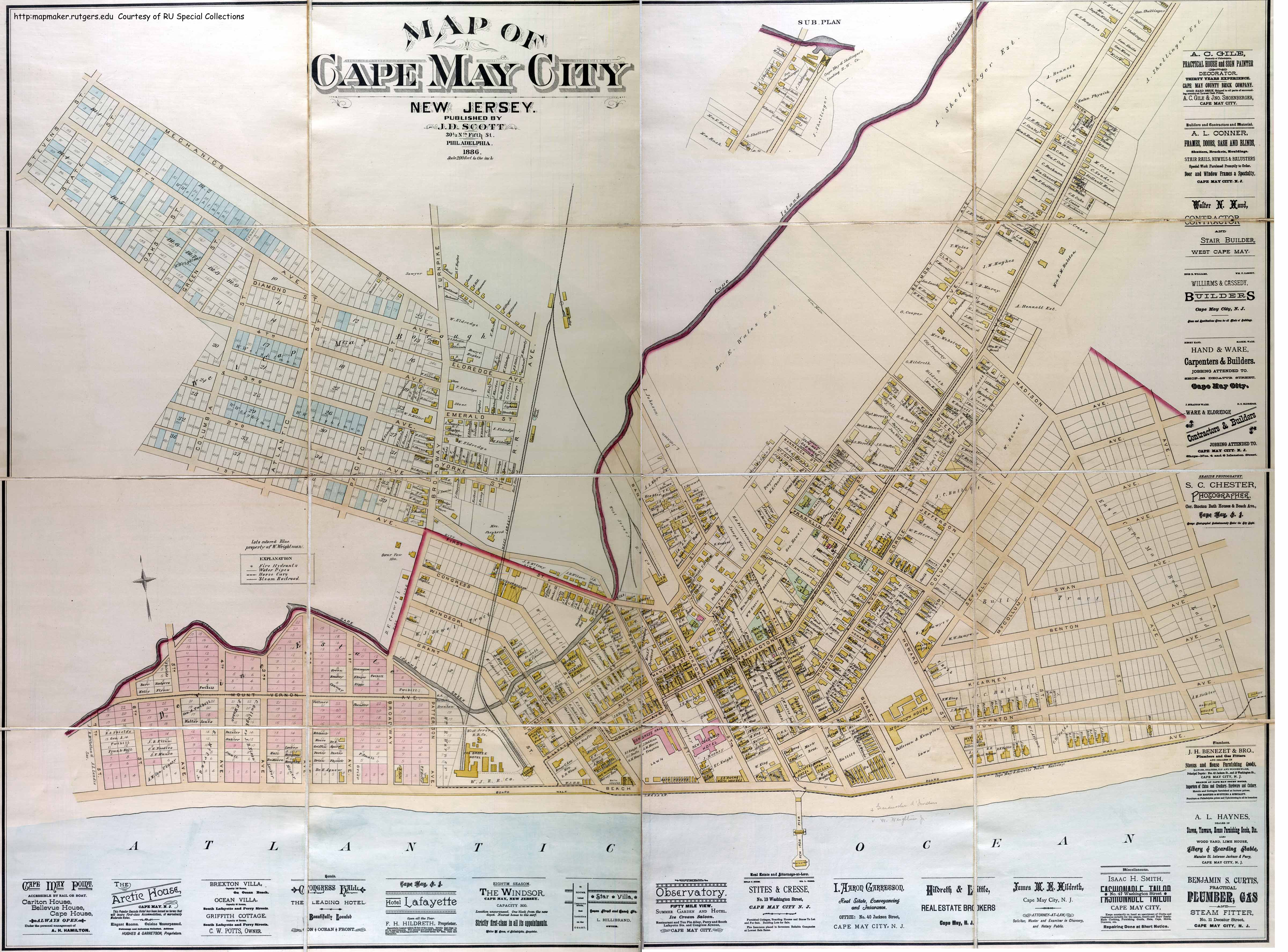
This 1886 map of Cape May includes advertisements for several of the hotels listed below, several of the builders and contractors, as well as for some of the original residents of the houses, such as attorney James Hildreth.

The City of Cape May sits at the south end of Cape May Peninsula which divides the Atlantic Ocean from the Delaware Bay. Cape May Point, about two miles west of the City of Cape May, borders the Bay, while Cape May City borders the Ocean. Cape Island Creek, a tidal "creek" and marsh, originally divided the site of the city from the rest of Cape May, but its southern end has long been covered with landfill. The Cape May Canal, built in 1942, now divides both Cape May City and Cape May Point from the rest of the peninsula.

== History of Cape May ==
Cape May was first discovered by Europeans by Henry Hudson on August 28, 1609. He landed on the shore of Delaware Bay a few miles north of Cape May Point before returning to the Atlantic Ocean. Cornelius Mey explored the area further in 1621 for the Dutch West India Company and by May, 1630 Samuel Godyn and Samuel Blommaert bought land for the Dutch from Native Americans covering the southern four miles of the Cape. In 1632 the Dutch established a fishing and whaling settlement in the area, but by 1638 colonists from New England had moved in. By the 1660s the English gained control and Daniel Coxe, a London Quaker, organized a government in 1687. Early settlers worked in the lumber, shipbuilding, whaling, fishing and shellfish industries. A road along the coast built in 1796 helped establish the hamlet of Cape May.

The early emergence of Cape May as a summer resort was due to easy transport by water from Philadelphia to the Atlantic Ocean. Early Cape May vacationers were carried to the town on sloops from Philadelphia, and water transport was also easy from New York, Baltimore, Washington, D.C. and points south. Southerners later became a large proportion of summer vacationers. The resort business in Cape May began to thrive when regular steamboat traffic on the Delaware River began after the War of 1812, carrying passengers from Philadelphia and New Castle, Delaware. Commodore Stephen Decatur made his summer home at the Atlantic Hotel about this time. The predecessor of the Congress Hall Hotel was opened in 1816 by Thomas Hughes. It took its current name in 1828, when Hughes was elected to Congress. In 1830 a visitor wrote that

Cape May Island is a noted and much frequented watering place, the season at which commences about the first of July and continues until the middle of August or the first of September. There are six boarding houses, three of which are very large; the sea bathing is convenient and excellent, the beach affords pleasant drives and there is excellent fishing in adjacent waters.

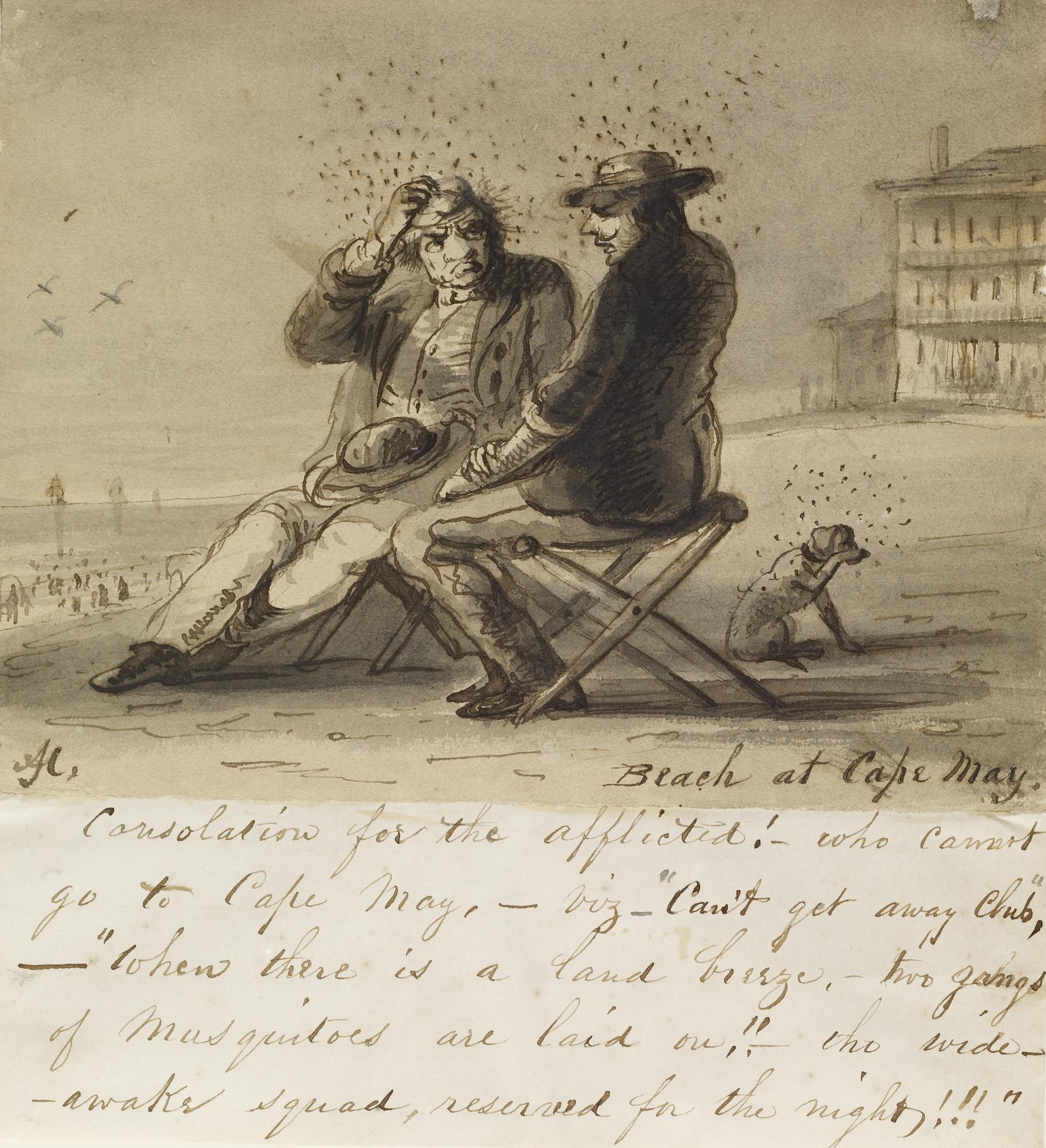
Cartoon, c. 1840, about Cape May vacationing by Alfred Jacob Miller.

Early visitors included Henry Clay in 1847, and possibly Abraham Lincoln in 1849. Serving Presidents who visited included Franklin Pierce (1855), James Buchanan (1858), Ulysses Grant (1873), Chester Arthur (1883), and Benjamin Harrison (1889). Harrison made Congress Hall his Summer White House. From the 1850s through the 1880s up to 3,000 visitors arrived each day during the summer season. Newport, Rhode Island, Saratoga Springs, New York and Long Branch, New Jersey were the town's main rivals in the summer resort business, as Cape May's reputation rose and fell with the whims of fashion.

During the 1850s summer cottages were first built and the construction of large hotels continued. Thomas U. Walter, the Architect of the Capitol, designed an addition to the Columbia Hotel. The Mount Vernon Hotel, which was designed to be the largest hotel in the world burned down in 1856, however, before its completion. Competition from Atlantic City appeared in 1854 with the construction of the Camden and Atlantic Railroad. Cape May was not connected to Philadelphia by rail until the completion of the Cape May & Millville Railroad in the mid-1860s.

Architect Stephen Decatur Button began designing buildings in Cape May in 1863 when he remodeled and expanded the Columbia Hotel. During the next thirty years he designed over forty buildings in the town. His best known buildings there include the John McCreary House (1869–70), Jackson's Clubhouse (1872), the Stockton Cottages (1872), the Windsor Hotel (1879) and the Atlantic Terrace Houses (1891–92). Plans for the George Allen House are believed to have been taken from a pattern book by Samuel Sloan. Architect Frank Furness is believed to have designed the Emlen Physick Estate, but may have otherwise visited Cape May only as a vacationer. Otherwise most of the buildings were built and designed by local builders in the vernacular style, borrowing from older buildings, pattern books and fashionable architects alike.

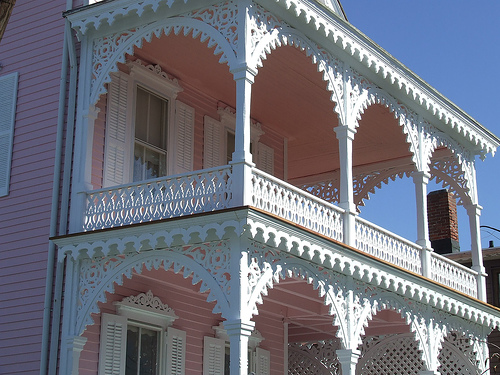
Gingerbread trim on a house built in 1882

Several fires destroyed portions of the town and the mostly wooden, frame-built houses. The fire of 1878 destroyed about half the town, but many buildings were quickly rebuilt. This fire gave a particular boost to Button's career, and many of the local builders appear to have copied Button's style at this time. These newer buildings were built with gingerbread trim, gables and turrets.

A Stroll along Beach Avenue, Cape May, New Jersey (Video 3:35)

From about 1900-1920 larger bungalows and mansions were built, especially on Beach Avenue on the eastern end of town. Having lost its transportation advantage with the coming of the railroad and the automobile, Cape May fell out of fashion as a popular resort. Atlantic City became the popular New Jersey beach resort in the 1920s and in the 1950s and 1960s the automobile-oriented Wildwoods, just north of Cape May, became a strong competitor, with its own distinctive architecture.

The district was added to the National Register of Historic Places in 1970, and then listed as a National Historic Landmark District in 1976. The NRHP nomination form does not include an inventory of the buildings in the district, but rather refers to about 20 buildings that were documented by drawings or photographs by the Historic American Buildings Survey (HABS). HABS now lists about 70 buildings in the district.

Architectural historians George E. Thomas and Carl Doebley list 100 significant buildings in their 1976 book Cape May, Queen of the Seaside Resorts: Its History and Architecture.

== Selected contributing properties ==
Contributing properties in the district include the following. Construction dates may be approximate. T&D reference gives the reference number from George E. Thomas and Carl Doebley's book with Roman numerals indicating the more significant buildings, and Arabic numerals the less significant buildings. Both lists are ordered by approximate date of construction. HABS reference links to the building's page in the Historic American Buildings Survey at the Library of Congress.

Name	Image	Address	Date	Architect	Builder	Notes	T&D reference	HABS reference
Erwin Agnew House		20 First Avenue; 38°55′52″N 74°55′57″W	1886	Unknown	Ware and Eldredge	In the Mt. Vernon tract	43	
George Allen House		720 Washington St. 38°56′8″N 74°55′8″W	1863-64	Plans from Samuel Sloan	Henry Phillipps	An elegant Italianate villa, called "one of the State's most impressive 19th-century seaside structures."	II	NJ0012
Arlington Hotel		Grant and North Streets; 38°55′52″N 74°55′39″W	1878	Unknown	Joseph Q. Williams	Also known as Huntington House.	25	NJ0928
Atlantic Terrace Houses		10, 12, 14, 16, 18, 20 Jackson St. 38°55′52″N 74°55′21″W	1891-92	Stephen Decatur Button	William Cassedy	Seven essentially identical balloon frame houses built on the site of the Atlantic Hotel. Three stories in height, with a one-story porch and a bay window with an ogee roof at the second story, they face an off-street courtyard.	XX	NJ0013
Julius Baily House		907 Stockton Avenue; 38°55′56″N 74°54′52″W	1895	Frank Gugert	Unknown		53	NJ0938
Baltimore Hotel		644 Hughes Street; 38°56′2″N 74°55′8″W	1867 or later	Unknown	Unknown	In 1896 the Episcopal church established The Girls' Friendly Society here.	4	
Beirn's Cottage		5 Perry Street; 38°55′50″N 74°55′23″W	1879	Enos Williams	Enos Williams	AKA Avenue House.	29	
George Boyd House		1501 Beach Avenue; 38°56′9″N 74°53′55″W	1911	Frank Seeburger	Unknown	Georgian Revival style with two-story porches.	XXVI	NJ0014
Charles Burns House		929-931 Beach Avenue; 38°55′53″N 74°54′48″W	1881-82	Enos Williams	Williams and Cassidy	Corner tower reflects the influence of the J. McCreary house.	33	NJ0952
Cape Island Baptist Church (1916)		SE corner of Columbia Avenue and Gurney Street; 38°55′56″N 74°55′09″W	1916	Ferdinand Witt	Winchester Bonham		67	NJ0954
Cape Island Presbyterian Church (1853)		417 Lafayette Street; 38°56′1″N 74°55′24″W	1853	Unknown	Peter Hand	Wooden construction with an "onion-style" cupola. First of two churches built by the congregation.	I	NJ0016
Cape Island Presbyterian Church (1898)		Hughes and Decatur; 38°55′55″N 74°55′18″W	1898	Isaac Purcell	George West	Third church built by the congregation and currently used by it.	XXIII	
Cape May City Firehouse		923 Washington St.	1875	none	Enos Williams	Across the street from the current fire station	19	NJ0354
Cape May High School		Washington St.	1917	Henry Vaughn	William Porter	Now used as city hall	68	
Carroll Villa		19 Jackson St. 38°55′52″N 74°55′21″W	1882 additions 1892 and 1895	Unknown	Charles Shaw for George Hildreth.	Eclectic Victorian style with Italianate motifs. Named for Charles Carroll to attract clientele from Maryland.	XVII	NJ0017
Chalfonte Hotel		NW corner of Howard and Sewell St. 38°55′58″N 74°55′5″W	1875, 1876, 1879, 1888, etc.	Unknown	C.Shaw, D.D. Moore & Sons, and others	Originally built for Henry Sawyer. "Cape May's oldest and most ornate large hotel."	VIII	NJ0018
Horatio Church House		921 Washington St.	1888	Unknown	Hand and Ware	Shingled walls and gable and turned porch posts.	44	
Cold Spring Life Saving Station		1111 Beach Avenue; 38°55′57″N 74°54′33″W	1890	Albert Bibb	Unknown	Now Kiwanis Club	47	
Colonial Hotel		Beach Dr. between Ocean and Gurney; 38°55′50″N 74°55′9″W	1894-95	William and C.S. Church	William and C.S. Church	South wing added 1905.	XXI	NJ0019
Congress Hall		251 Beach Dr. (between Congress and Perry); 38°55′51″N 74°55′28″W	1879	J.F. Meyer	Richard Dobbins	Three-story veranda with mansard roof. Very large hotel visited by several presidents, including Benjamin Harrison who had offices here in 1891. Third hotel on the site. S.D. Button addition 1880.	X	NJ0020
Cook's Villa		9 Perry St. 38°55′51″N 74°55′24″W	1879	Unknown	Wiliam L. Cummings	Second Empire style, with two-story porch with pierced tile trimming. Also known as Fryer's Cottage.	28	NJ0021
Denizot's Ocean View House		Decatur and Beach Avenues; 38°55′50″N 74°55′16″W	1879	Unknown	Unknown		27	NJ0930
Ebbitt House		25 Jackson Street; 38°55′53″N 74°55′21″W	1879	Enos Williams	Enos Williams	Also known as Virginia Cottage.	30	
J.R. Evans House		207 Congress Place; 38°55′54″N 74°55′31″W	1882-83	Stephen Decatur Button	Joseph Stretch	Simple proportions and horizontal form typical of Button.	XV	NJ0512
Charles Ferguson House		101 South Lafayette Street; 38°55′53″N 74°55′35″W	1870-71	Stephen Decatur Button	Hand and Ware		13	NJ0934
First Baptist Church		727-731 Franklin; 38°56′8″N 74°55′16″W	1879	C.H. Brown	Charles Shaw	Congregation moved to Cape Island Baptist Church in 1916. This building then became the Franklin Street United Methodist Church, and is now condominiums. One story built in the Gothic Revival style. The spire was destroyed by lightning in the early 20th century.	XII	NJ0015
John Forsythe House		1601 Beach Avenue; 38°56′11″N 74°53′48″W	1910-11	J.A. Dempwald		Original cost $35,000	58	
Frank Furness Cottage		261 Grant Street; 38°55′59″N 74°55′49″W	1870	Unknown	R.J.Dobbins	Owned, but not designed, by famous architect Frank Furness	10	
Christopher Gallagher House		45 Jackson Street; 38°55′55″N 74°55′22″W	1882-83	Charles Shaw	Charles Shaw	Originally identical to the Hildreth Cottage.	38	NJ0943
J.H. Gemrig House		107 Ocean St.	1888 or 1889	Unknown	Unknown		45	NJ0946
George Graham Cottage		20 Queen St. 38°55′55″N 74°54′48″W	1914	Unknown	Otis Townsend		63	
Charles Grange House		1229 New Jersey Avenue; 38°56′07″N 74°54′15″W	1912	Unknown	Sherman Sharp	First and most expensive of 5 similar houses.	60	
Nelson Z. Graves House		1117 New Jersey Avenue; 38°56′03″N 74°54′25″W	1912	Lloyd Titus	Unknown	Eclectic style.	XXIX	
Douglas Gregory House		102 Ocean Street; 38°55′54″N 74°55′14″W	1881-82	Unknown	Unknown	Conservative, symmetrical, but rich design.	37	NJ0935
Joseph Hall Cottage		645 Hughes St.	1868	Unknown	Unknown		5	NJ0686
Frederick Harding Cottage		1117 Beach Avenue	1916	Dehmond, Ashmead, Bickley	Sherman Sharp	Built on Cape May Real Estate Co. land after its liquidation.	66	
Joseph Hanes House		206 Perry Street; 38°55′57″N 74°55′30″W	1879-80	Enos Williams	Samuel Colladay	Typical Gothic Revival center-gabled cottage with elaborate porch.	XIII	
Harrison, Warne and Morris Houses		615, 617, 621 Columbia Avenue; 38°55′56″N 74°55′11″W	1867-68	Stephen Decatur Button	Hand and Ware	All similar except that the Morris House has cast iron used on the porch.	IV	NJ0942
John T. Hewitt House		1311 New Jersey Avenue; 38°56′08″N 74°54′11″W	1914	Ferdinand Witt	York Brothers	Six bedrooms, 3 baths, 3 servant rooms and a garage with chauffeur's quarters.	XXX	
George Hildreth House		17 Jackson St. 38°55′52″N 74°55′20″W	1882	None	Charles Shaw	Hexagonal porch reflects Button's influence.	XVI	NJ0022
James Hildreth House		815 Washington Street; 38°56′12″N 74°55′07″W	1885	Unknown	Francis Duke		40	
Francis Hill House		1001 Beach Drive	1910-11	Frank Seeburger	Metzger and Wells	Interesting double gable. Original cost $20,000.	57	
House at 10 Broadway		10 Broadway; 38°55′51″N 74°55′53″W		Unknown	Unknown			NJ0929
House at 815 Kearney		815 Kearney; 38°55′52″N 74°55′20″W		Unknown	Unknown	Shingle style.		NJ0925
House at 817 Kearney		817 Kearney; 38°55′52″N 74°55′20″W		Unknown	Unknown	Shingle style.		NJ0924
Dr. Henry Hunt House		209 Congress Place; 38°55′54″N 74°55′30″W	1881, renovated in the 1890s	Unknown	George Stretch	1890s addition added plumbing and ornament.	35	NJ0862
Jackson's Clubhouse		635 Columbia Avenue; 38°55′58″N 74°55′9″W	1872	Stephen Decatur Button	Hand and Ware	Originally a gambling club. "S.D. Button's finest surviving design in Cape May."	VII	NJ0025
J.F. Jacoby House		Columbia and Franklin; 38°56′02″N 74°55′04″W	1899-1900	Unknown	York Bros.	Colonial Revival style, with some decorative millwork.	52	
Barclay Johnson House		1119-21 New Jersey Avenue	1913-14	Unknown	Sherman Sharp	Several features indicate a new "East Cape May" style.	62	
Eldridge Johnson House		33 Perry St. 38°55′54″N 74°55′26″W	1882	Unknown	Unknown	Moved from 225 Congress St. in 1970. Now known as the Pink House. "A tour de force in decorative millwork."	XIV	NJ0026
E.C. Knight House		203 Congress Place; 38°55′53″N 74°55′32″W	1882-83	Stephen Decatur Button	Unknown	Nearly identical to the Evans House next door.	36	NJ0500
Jacob Leaming House		712 Columbia Avenue; 38°56′01″N 74°55′04″W	1879	Unknown	Unknown	Permanent awning a recent addition.	31	
James Leaming House		130 Decatur St.	1895	Unknown	Ware and Eldredge	Tiny cottage (on left in photo) with complex front. Roseman Cottage on the right.	51	
Joseph Leedom House		111-113 Congress St. 38°55′54″N 74°55′34″W	1887	Charles Collum	Unknown	Queen Anne style.	XIX	
Joseph Lewis House		819 Beach Dr. 38°55′52″N 74°54′56″W	1870	Unknown	Unknown	Stone basement and porch with Doric columns added 1905.	14	NJ0028
S.R. Ludlam House		Kearney and Jefferson Streets; 38°55′58″N 74°54′56″W	1875	Unknown	Unknown	Moved from Ocean and Columbia Avenue around 1900	23	
Macomber Hotel		NW corner of Beach Dr. and Howard St. 38°55′52″N 74°55′1″W	1919 or later	Unknown	Unknown	Reflects the "quiet middle-class resort of the 1920s."	69	NJ0024
Peter McCollum development houses		705 & 725 Columbia Avenue	1868-72	Peter McCollum (possibly)	Richard Souder (probably)	A basic formula was used by developer Peter McCollum, usually with contractor Richard Souder. After one house was built and sold, another would be built nearby.	7	
John McConnell House		13 Jackson Street; 38°55′52″N 74°55′20″W	1882 or later	Unknown	Unknown	Sophisticated form, possibly from a Philadelphia architect.	39	NJ0033
George McCreary House		606 Columbia Avenue	1873	Stephen Decatur Button	Ware and Eldridge		18	
John B. McCreary House		SW corner of Gurney and Columbia St. 38°55′56″N 74°55′10″W	1869-70	Stephen Decatur Button	Richard Dobbins	Also known as the Christian Science Society.	V	NJ0030
Kate McCreary House		1005 Beach Avenue; 38°55′54″N 74°54′45″W	1922-1924	Zantzinger, Borie, and Medary attributed	W.L. Cummings attributed	Known locally as the "Mae West house" due to its protruding porches.	70	NJ0951
Evan Morris Cottage		17 Ocean St. 38°55′52″N 74°55′11″W	1888	Charles Shaw	Charles Shaw		46	
William Morice House		937 Beach Avenue; 38°55′54″N 74°54′47″W	1912	Brochie and Hastings	Sherman Sharp & Co.	Colonial Revival	59	
Jacob Neafie House		26-30 Congress Street; 38°55′53″N 74°55′33″W	1865-66	Unknown	Unknown	Built as a twin house for Jacob Neafie and John Levy, proprietors of Neafie, Levy, and Co.	2	NJ0824
Jacob Neafie and John Levy stable		33 Windsor Street; 38°55′52″N 74°55′35″W	1865-66	Unknown	Unknown	Converted from a stable into a cottage.	3	
New Jersey Trust and Safe Deposit		526 Washington St. 38°56′0″N 74°55′17″W	1895	Thomas Stephens	Samuel Wiley	Small Renaissance Revival style first used as a bank, then as city hall, now as a store.	XXII	NJ0031
New York Avenue Development House		1021 New York Avenue	1909-11	C.E. Shermerhorn (possibly)	Unknown	One of 21 originally identical houses, all modified in 1916.	56	
George Ogden Cottage		737 Washington St.	1895	Unknown	George Ogden (probably)	Ogden was a lumberyard operator and contractor. He may have sold the "standard gingerbread" elements from his lumberyard.	48	
Henry Parker Cottage		22 Jackson St.	1896 or later	Unknown	Unknown	Similar in design to Aaron Roseman Cottage	49	
Emlen Physick Estate		1048 Washington St. 38°56′26″N 74°54′52″W	1878-79	Frank Furness (attributed)	Charles Shaw	Very similar to Furness's William Rhawn House (1879) in Philadelphia.	IX	NJ0034
Potts Cottage		511 Hughes Street; 38°55′56″N 74°55′17″W	1881	Unknown	Unknown	Tiny cottage with an elaborately infilled gable.	32	NJ0937
Russell Robinson Development House		1607 New Jersey Avenue; 38°56′15″N 74°53′48″W	1914-15	Unknown	Russell Robinson	One of 6 adjoining houses, all built on speculation.	64	
Aaron Roseman Cottage		132 Decatur St. 38°55′56″N 74°55′21″W	1895-96	Unknown	Walter Peterman	Similar in construction to Parker Cottage.	50	NJ0957
St. John's Episcopal Church		Washington and Franklin St. 38°56′5″N 74°55′11″W	1867-68	Henry Sims	Richard Souder	Original stained glass windows by I.C. Spence of Montreal.	III	NJ0036
St. Mary's Catholic Church		Washington and Ocean Streets; 38°56′0″N 74°55′16″W	1911	George Lovett	William McShane	Norman revival. Ceiling decorated with stars.	XXVII	NJ0949
Jeremiah Schellenger House		1284 Lafayette St. 38°56′45″N 74°54′42″W	1860	Unknown	Unknown	2 story octagon house with Italianate details.	20	NJ0032
General Sewell House		249 Grant; 38°55′58″N 74°55′46″W	1870	Unknown	R.J. Dobbins	Built or sponsored by the West Jersey Railroad.	11	
William Sewell, Jr. House		1507 Beach Avenue; 38°56′10″N 74°53′54″W	1912	Zantzinger, Borie & Medary	William Cummings		XXVIII	NJ0950
Peter Shields House		1301-1303 Beach Avenue; 38°56′4″N 74°54′11″W	1906-07	Lloyd Titus	William Cummings	First owner also was president of Cape May Real Estate Company.	XXV	
Moses Simon Cottage		631 Columbia Avenue; 38°55′58″N 74°55′10″W	1870	Unknown	Unknown		9	
Selina Slaymaker House		11 North Street; 38°55′56″N 74°55′39″W	1877	Unknown	Unknown	Also known as Dolores Cottage.	24	
Peter Small House		14 Broadway	1885 or earlier	Unknown	Unknown	In the Mt. Vernon tract. Developed by Mark Devine. Porch added later.	42	
Morning Star Villa		1307 Beach Avenue; 38°56′04″N 74°54′10″W	1884-85 and later additions	Collins and Autenreich	Ware and Eldridge	Fourth floor built 1893 above the mansard roof.	XVIII	NJ0963
Dr. R. Walter Starr Cottage		1500 New Jersey Avenue; 38°56′11″N 74°53′57″W	1906	R.E. White	Metzgers and White		55	
Joseph and John Steiner Cottages		22 and 24 Congress Street	1851	Unknown	Unknown		1	
John K. Stites Cottage		659 Hughes Street	1869-70	Unknown	Hoffman and Williams		8	
Stockton Cottages		12, 14, 16, 18, 20, 22, 24, 26, 28, 30 Gurney St. 38°55′54″N 74°55′9″W	1872	Stephen Decatur Button	Harden and Bro.	Lavish exteriors, simple interiors. All very similar except for larger porches on 26-30.	VI	NJ0039
John Tack House		715 Columbia Avenue	1872-73	Stephen Decatur Button	Joseph Q. Williams		16	
Henry Tatham House		805 Beach Avenue; 38°55′52″N 74°54′58″W	1872-73	Stephen Decatur Button	Hand and Ware	Also known as Stockton Manor	17	NJ0944
Otis Townsend House		115 Reading St. 38°56′6″N 74°54′22″W	1915	Unknown	Unknown	On long narrow lot. Built by carpenter-developer Townsend.	65	
James Trindle House		1120 New Jersey Avenue	1913-14	Duhring, Okie, and Ziegler	Thompson, Dickson, & Co.	Colonial Revival	61	
Thomas Wales House		1033-1035 Lafayette Street; 38°56′27″N 74°55′0″W	1870	Unknown	Unknown	Modernized in 1898 by McCollin and Fast.	12	NJ0140
Dr. Ware's Drugstore		Ocean and Columbia Streets; 38°55′55″N 74°55′13″W	1876	Unknown	Unknown		22	NJ0955
J. Stratton Ware House		653 Hughes Street	1868 or later	Unknown	Probably J. S. Ware		6	NJ0825
Thomas Webster House		933 Washington St. 38°56′20″N 74°55′01″W	1876	Enos Williams	Enos Williams		21	
William Weightman House		Trenton Avenue near Beach; 38°56′06″N 74°54′13″W	1881-82 (alteration)	Unknown	Ware and Eldredge (alteration)	Moved from Washington and Franklin to Ocean and Beach avenues, then to Reading Avenue.	34	NJ0947
Thomas Williamson Cottage		501 Hughes Street	1885	Unknown	Unknown		41	
John Wilson Cottages		15 & 17 Jefferson St.	1901	Unknown	William L. Cummings		54	
Windsor Hotel		Beach Drive between Congress and Windsor; 38°55′49″N 74°55′30″W	1879	Stephen Decatur Button	Hoover and Hughes	Built immediately after 1878 fire. The fourth floor and elevator were added in 1899. Destroyed by fire on May 18, 1979.	XI	NJ0004

== See also ==
- National Register of Historic Places listings in Cape May County, New Jersey
- Victorian architecture
- Wildwoods Shore Resort Historic District

== Sources ==
- Dorwart, Jeffery M. (1992). Cape May County, New Jersey: the making of an American resort community. Rutgers University Press. p. 355. ISBN 978-0-8135-1784-1.
- Pitts, Carolyn (1977). The Cape May Handbook. Athenaeum of Philadelphia. p. 77. ISBN 978-0-916530-08-2.
- Salvini, Emil R. (2004). The summer city by the sea: Cape May, New Jersey: an illustrated history'. Rutgers University Press. p. 146. ISBN 978-0-8135-2261-6.
- Thomas, George E.; Carl Doebley; Chris Zelov (1998). Cape May, Queen of the Seaside Resorts: Its History and Architecture (2nd ed.). The Knossus Project, Mid-Atlantic Center for the Arts. ISBN 978-0-9663295-0-6.
