= Joseph C. Hoxie =

American architect

Joseph C. Hoxie (14 August 1814 – 9 January 1870) was an American architect.

== Early life ==
He was born in Rhode Island.

== Career ==
Hoxie was trained to the buildings trade in Connecticut and was working in Hoboken, New Jersey, by 1840.

He moved to Philadelphia and formed a partnership with his brother-in-law Stephen Decatur Button in 1848. The partnership was dissolved in 1852 though they occasionally collaborated on some projects afterwards.

In November 1852 Norris Garshom Starkweather started working for Hoxie and they became partners in 1854. The partnership broke down and it was dissolved in July 1854. The Court of common pleas records a case filed in August 1854 to divide the assets of the partnership though this case was not resolved in 1858.

After returning to independent practice he designed railroad stations and churches. Harrisburg station (built 1857, demolished 1877) and Arch Street Presbyterian Church are examples of his work. He also designed Market Street Presbyterian Church in Harrisburg (1858-1860), a significant work of the Romanesque Revival in the U.S..
