= Norris Garshom Starkweather =

American architect

Norris Garshom Starkweather (1818-1885) was an American architect.

== Early life ==
He was born in 1818 in Windham County, Vermont, the son of Garsholm Starkweather, a farmer-carpenter and grist-and-saw mill owner, and Sally Starkweather. He was the youngest of six children. From around 1824 to 1834 the family lived in Canaan, Vermont.

He was apprenticed to a builder in 1830 and by 1845 had become a contractor in Massachusetts.

== Career ==
He had established an architectural practise by the mid-1840s and he moved to Philadelphia in the mid-1850s, specialising in church designs. According to the records of the Court of common pleas Starkweather started work with Joseph C. Hoxie in November 1852 and became a full partner in 1854. The partnership with Hoxie broke down and was dissolved by July 1854. The Common Pleas case was to divide the assets of the office but this took until 1858. He appeared in Philadelphia city directories as an architect in 1854.

The First Presbyterian Church, Baltimore was probably why he moved to Baltimore. He also designed Italianate villas in Maryland and Virginia.

In 1860 he opened an office in Washington, D.C. After the Civil War became the partner of Thomas M. Plowman in the architectural and engineering firm of Starkweather & Plowman (1868–1871). Little is known of his career following the Panic of 1873 though he was listed in Washington directories until 1881. George A. Frederick commented that after an erratic career Starkweather had moved to New York.

In the middle of 1880 he moved to New York and became a partner of Robert Napier Anderson in the firm Starkweather and Anderson at 106 Broadway. From 1881 to about 1884 he was the partner of Charles E. Gibbs, with whom he designed the Potter Building, the Second Avenue Methodist Episcopal Church (since demolished) and . In 1881 their offices were in the World Building owned by Orlando B. Potter.

From 1882 until his death he was an associate of the American Institute of Architects.

== Death ==
He died in December 1885 before the Potter building was completed. He was buried in Bridgeport, Connecticut.
