= John B. McCreary House =

Historic house in New Jersey, United States

- U.S. Historic district – Contributing property
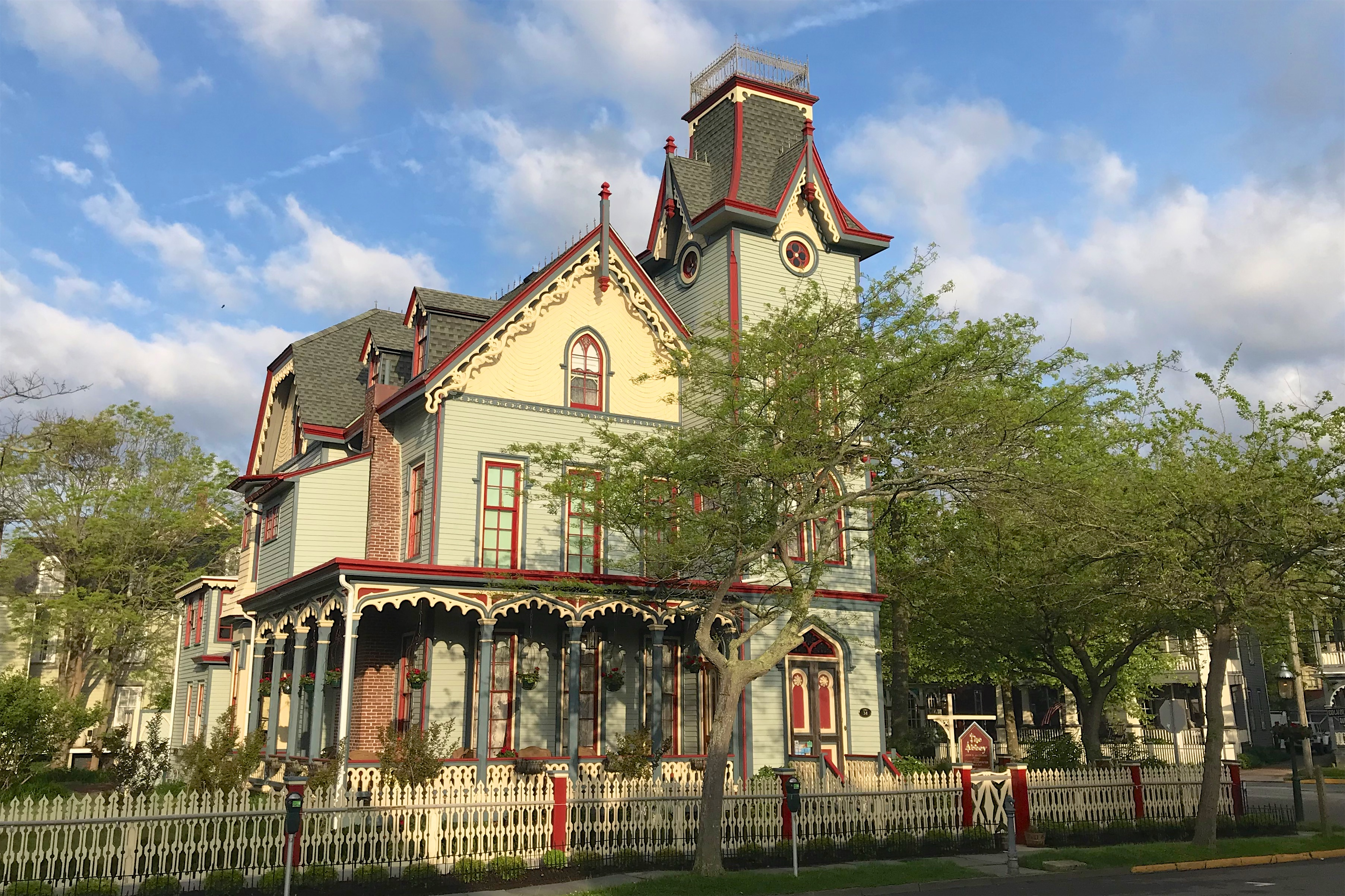
- The Abbey in 2018

- Location within Cape May County, New Jersey Location within New Jersey Location within the United States
- Location: 34 Gurney Street; Cape May, New Jersey
- Coordinates: 38°55′55″N 74°55′10″W
- Built: 1869–1870
- Architect: Stephen Decatur Button
- Part of: Cape May Historic District (ID70000383)

The John B. McCreary House, also formerly known as the Christian Science Society and most recently The Abbey, is an historic Victorian building located at 34 Gurney Street, corner of Columbia Street, in Cape May, New Jersey. Designed by Philadelphia architect Stephen Decatur Button, it was built for $20,000 between 1869 and 1870 for State Senator John B. McCreary, a Pennsylvania coal baron.

It is a contributing property in the Cape May Historic District, which was added to the National Register of Historic Places in 1970.

From 1979 to 2012, the structure was operated as The Abbey Bed and Breakfast Inn. The owners extensively restored the building while adding bathrooms for each suite.

The historic property was listed for sale in 2006 and was sold in 2012. The building is now operated as a whole house rental instead of as a B&B.

== Gallery ==
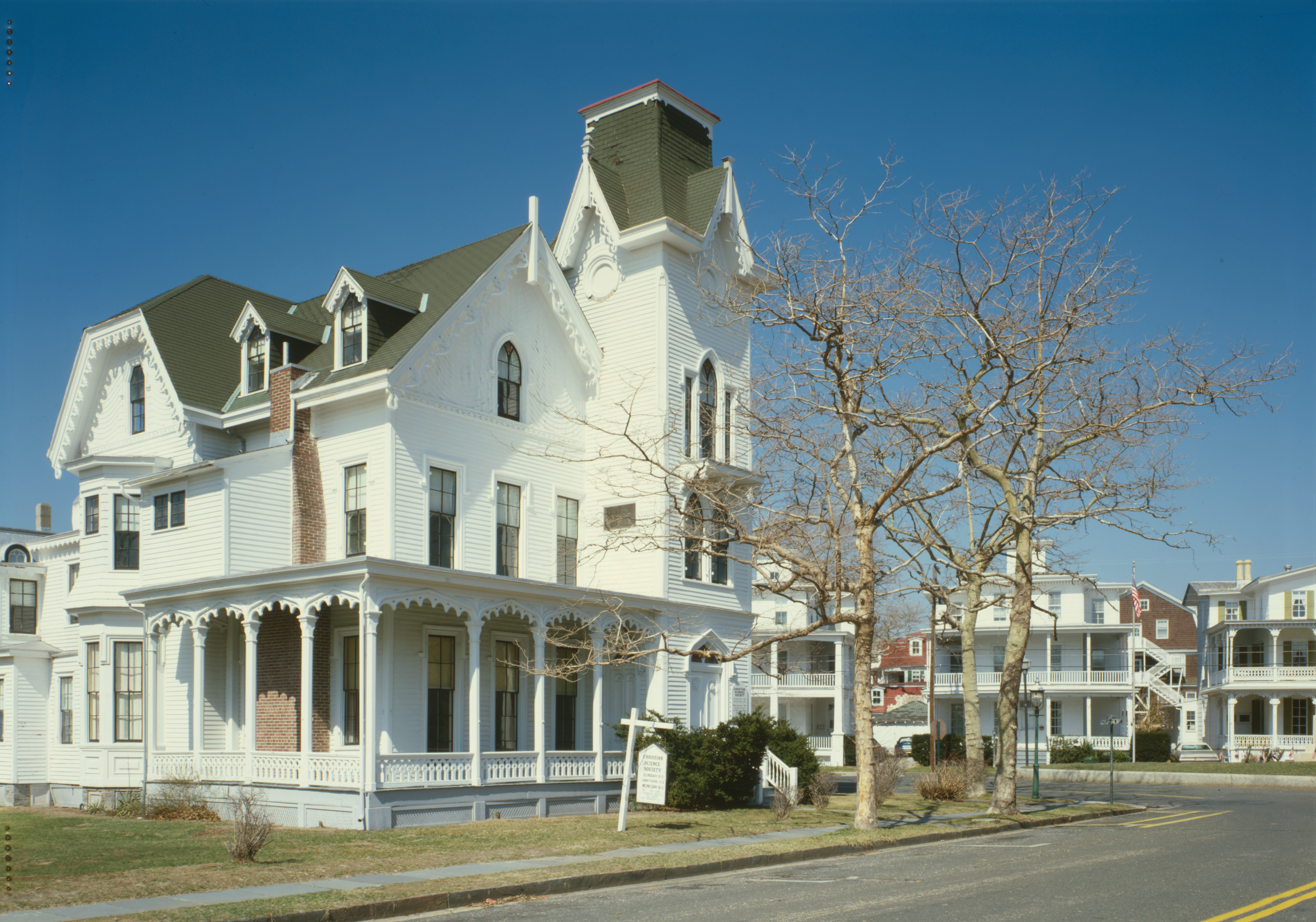
HABS photo from 1977

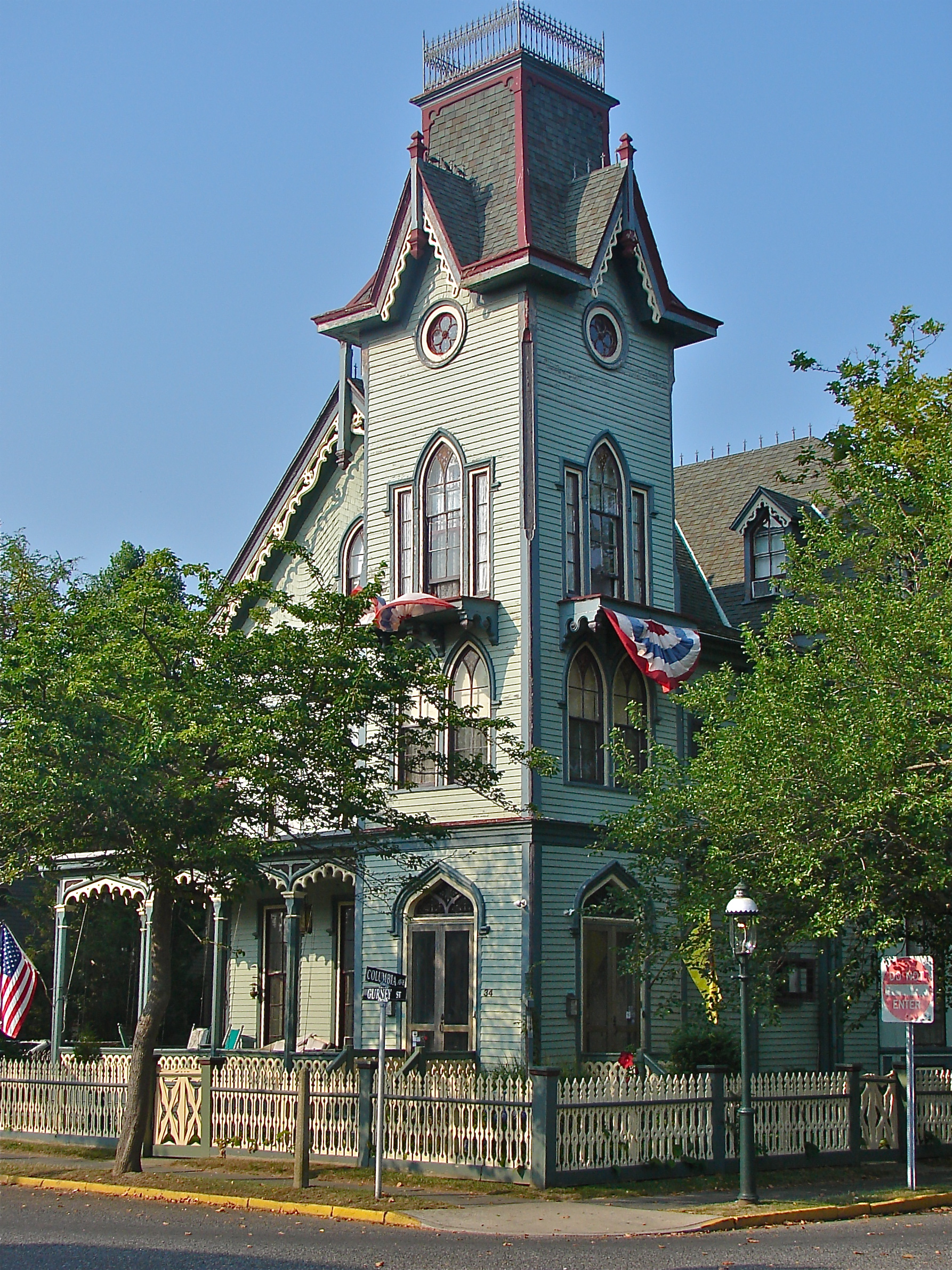
Photo from 2011
