= Carroll Villa =

- U.S. Historic district – Contributing property
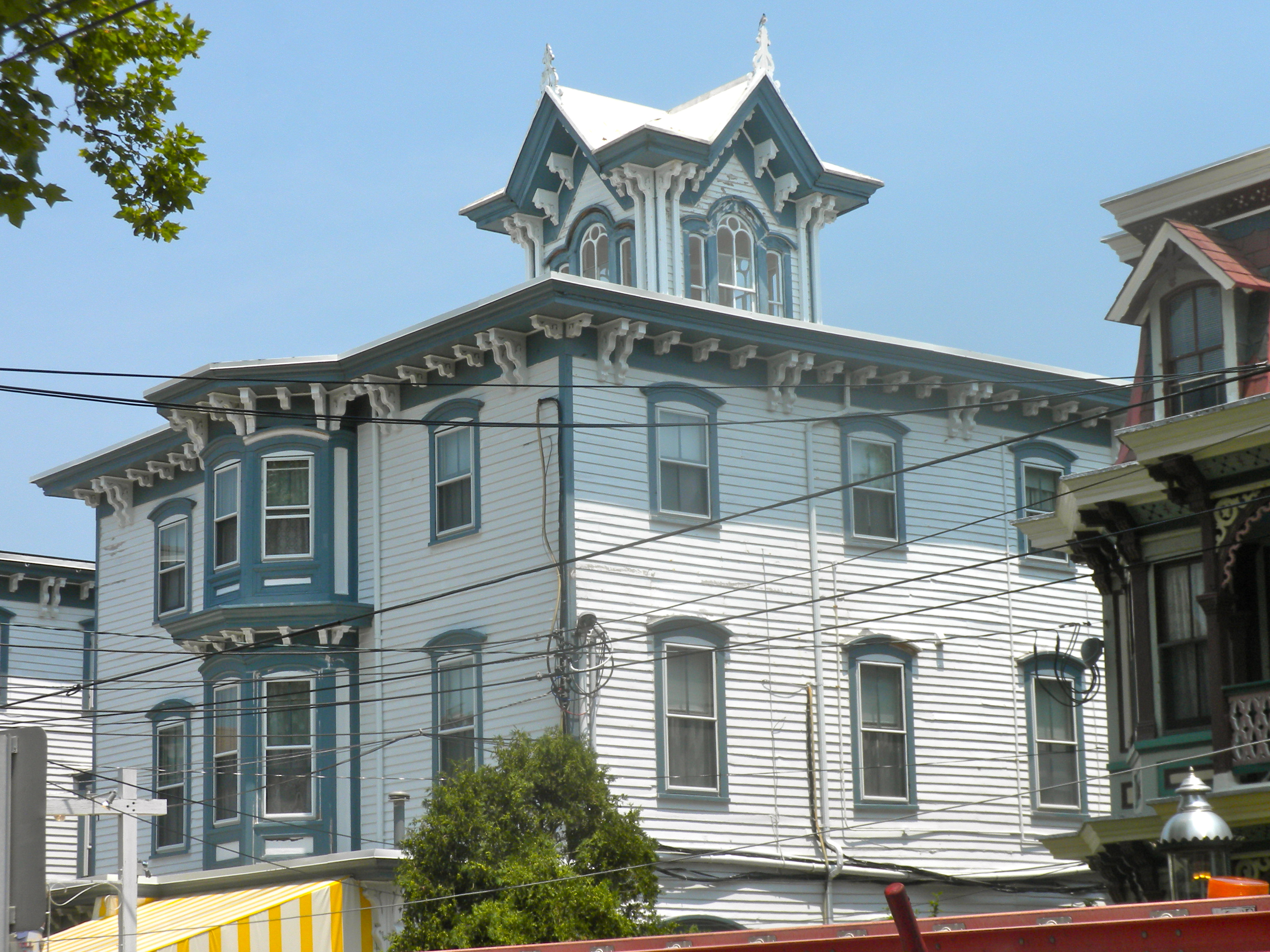
- The Villa in 2010

- Location within Cape May County, New Jersey Location within New Jersey Location within the United States
- Location: 19 Jackson Street; Cape May, New Jersey
- Coordinates: 38°55′52″N 74°55′21″W
- Built: 1882
- Part of: Cape May Historic District (ID70000383)

The Carroll Villa is a historic hotel in Cape May, New Jersey. It is a contributing property in the Cape May Historic District, which was added to the National Register of Historic Places in 1970.

The hotel is a 19th-century Victorian-style structure. Some characteristic features are its stout cupola, long windows, and a blue and white symmetrical front. There is a yellow-and-white-striped awning on the porch, a garden terrace in the back, and skylights on the roof. The Carroll Villa has 19 guest rooms. It was named after Charles Carroll, a signer of the Declaration of Independence.

The Carroll Villa was built in 1882. In 1976, World War II veteran and Legion of Honor recipient Harry Kulkowitz opened the Mad Batter restaurant in the hotel, getting the idea while playing poker in the hotel. The name comes from Alice's Adventures in Wonderland by Lewis Carroll. Kulkowitz purchased the hotel in 1978. In 1983, a review in The New York Times praised the Mad Batter for its lychee duck and snow peas, introduced after Kulkowitz visited Thailand and brought back a chef. He did major renovations on the hotel in 1985, introducing air conditioning, refurbishing antique furniture, and adding a bathroom to every guest room. In 2016, Kulkowitz's son Mark and his wife Pam Huber, who currently own the hotel and restaurant, renovated the front porch to become a year-round gathering spot. Plexiglas panels and additional seating was added to accommodate live music. Harry Kulkowitz died on August 22, 2017.

The Mad Batter's specialty is its breakfast. The oatmeal pancakes were praised by the Boston Globe as "simple, hearty, and a trusty companion to any breakfast drink." The orange and almond French toast is made with thick brioche bread soaked in cream and orange juice and then fried and topped with almonds. Belgian waffles with pecans is a favorite of restaurant manager Marta Cobleigh. The crab cake Eggs Benedict has been acclaimed by food critics and is popular with customers.
