= Arch Street Presbyterian Church =

Historic church in Pennsylvania, United States

- U.S. National Register of Historic Places
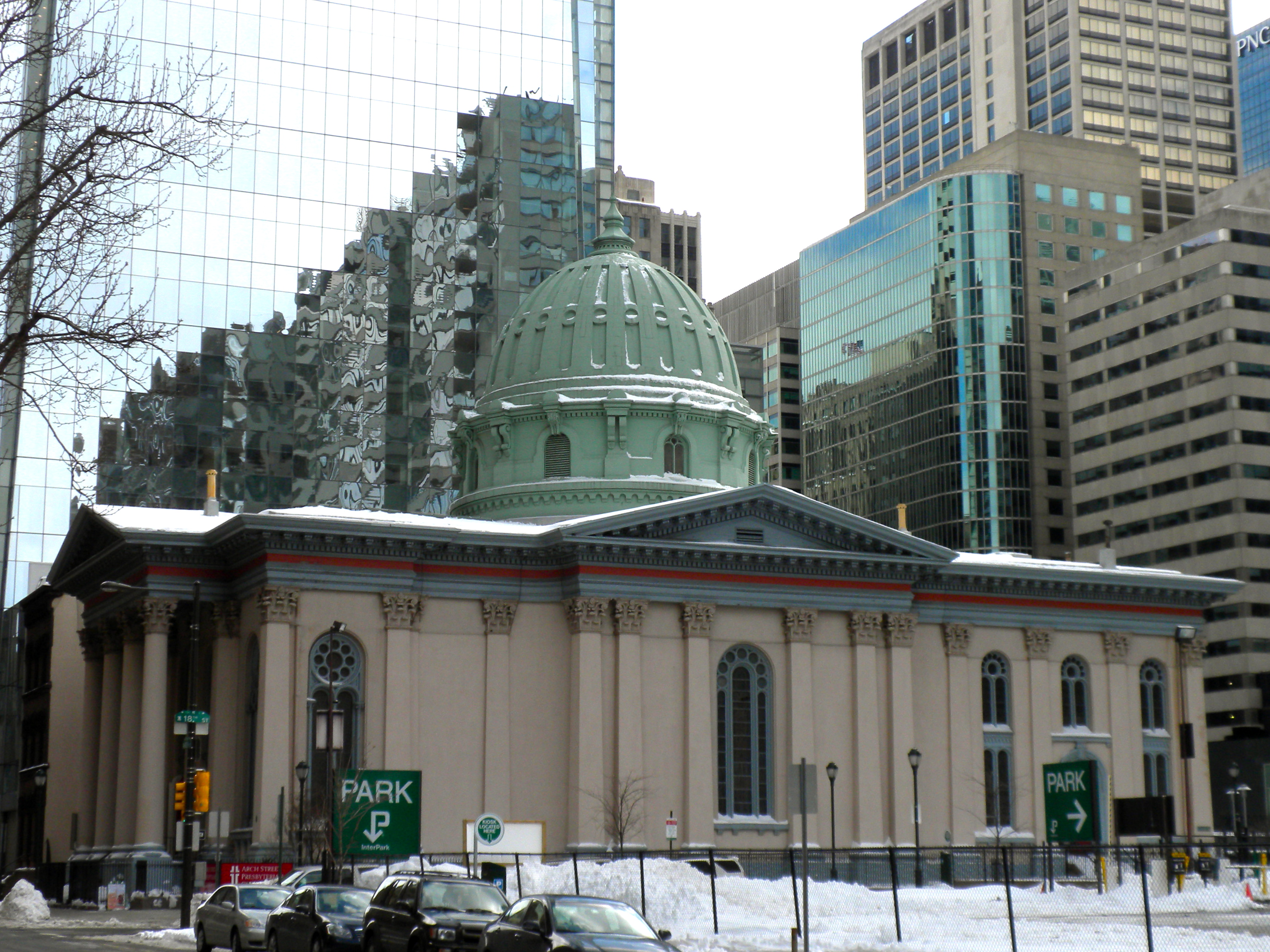
- Arch Street Presbyterian Church, February 2010

- Location within Philadelphia Location within Pennsylvania Location within the United States
- Location: 1726-1732 Arch St., Philadelphia, Pennsylvania
- Coordinates: 39.954894°N 75.169374°W
- Area: less than one acre
- Built: 1855
- Architect: Hoxie & Button
- Architectural style: Classical Revival
- NRHP reference No.: 71000717
- Added to NRHP: May 27, 1971

Arch Street Presbyterian Church is a historic Presbyterian Church at 1724 Arch Street, located between the two Comcast skyscrapers (Comcast Center and Comcast Technology Center) in the Logan Square neighborhood of Philadelphia, Pennsylvania. The building was designed by the architectural firm of Hoxie & Button, and built in 1855. It is a one-story, Classical Revival style building with Greek and Roman elements. It features a portico supported by four Corinthian order columns and a coffered dome.

It was added to the National Register of Historic Places in 1971.

== History ==
=== 19th and 20th centuries ===
Built in 1855, Arch Street Presbyterian Church (ASPC), was the "establishment" downtown Presbyterian church through the 19th and much of the 20th century. The architecture is neo-classic Greek revival style, a contrast to the modern Comcast Center skyscraper next door. The interior features ornate columns, a domed ceiling, and a massive organ.

In the 1920s and 1930s, the church was a conservative bastion in the theological debates that rocked the Presbyterian Church and other mainline Protestant denominations. ASPC's head pastor during this period, Rev. Clarence E. Macartney, engaged in a public debate with one of the leading modernist preachers, Rev. Harry Emerson Fosdick of New York City. Vincent Persichetti served as organist and choirmaster from 1932 to 1948.

During the latter 20th century, the congregation dwindled as many members moved out of Center City Philadelphia.

=== 21st century ===
By the early 2000s, the church had only a few dozen active members. However, the pews were packed on Sunday, January 28, 2007, when Prince Charles and Duchess Camilla worshipped at the church during their visit to the U.S.

In 2008, the Presbytery of Philadelphia of the Presbyterian Church (USA) decided to attempt to revitalize the church. Rev. William Golderer, who is also the convening pastor of Broad Street Ministry, was recruited to lead the effort. The pastoral staff now includes Rev. Golderer, Head Pastor; Rev. Carla A. Jones Brown, Minister of Encouragement, Inspiration and Intercession; Rev. David Norse, Minister for Pastoral Counseling & LGBTQ Belonging; Rev. Anne Park, Minister for Executive Leadership; Rev. Mike Pulsifer, Minister for Outreach, and Dr. J. Donald Dumpson, Minister of Music. Dr. Dumpson comes from the African-American Baptist tradition, and he leads a music program that includes classical, traditional, folk, and gospel influences.

The church now has growing attendance and membership of over 100, with a diverse racial and socioeconomic makeup. The church's current theology could be characterized as progressive and inclusive, with worship in the Reformed Protestant tradition. Programming includes a Sunday School for children during worship, outreach activities, a Deacons ministry, a "Good Book Club" (Wednesday lunchtime Bible Study), and "Church in the Alehouse" (a monthly meeting in a local pub to discuss issues of faith and life). The church hosts Arch Street Preschool, a weekday preschool operated by a 501(c)(3) nonprofit corporation. The church's mission statement includes a commitment to "[w]elcome and anticipate the presence of those new to faith, those longing for a deeper connection with God and neighbor, and those suspicious of the trappings of religion."

== Gallery ==
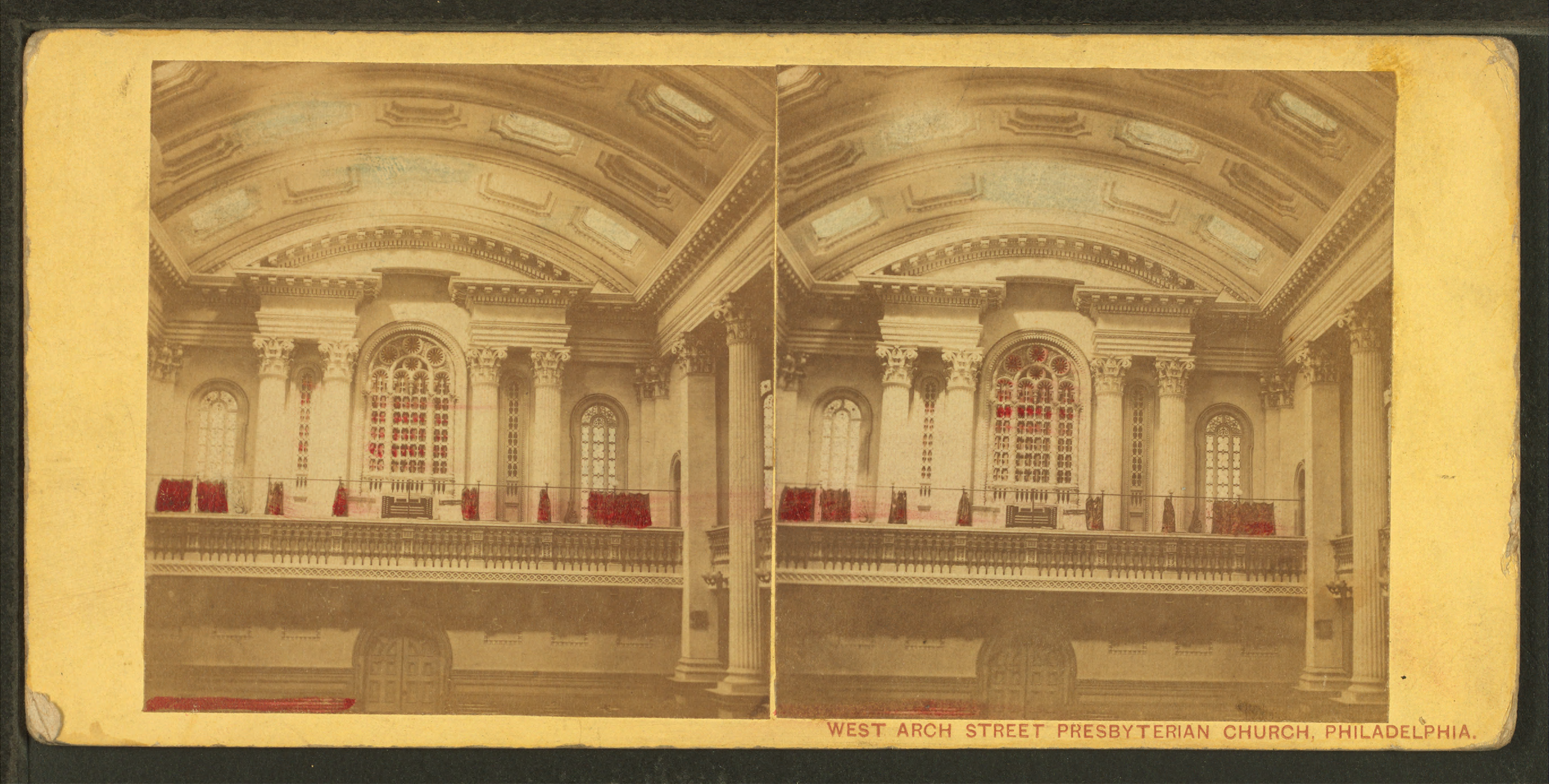
Interior, c. 1861.

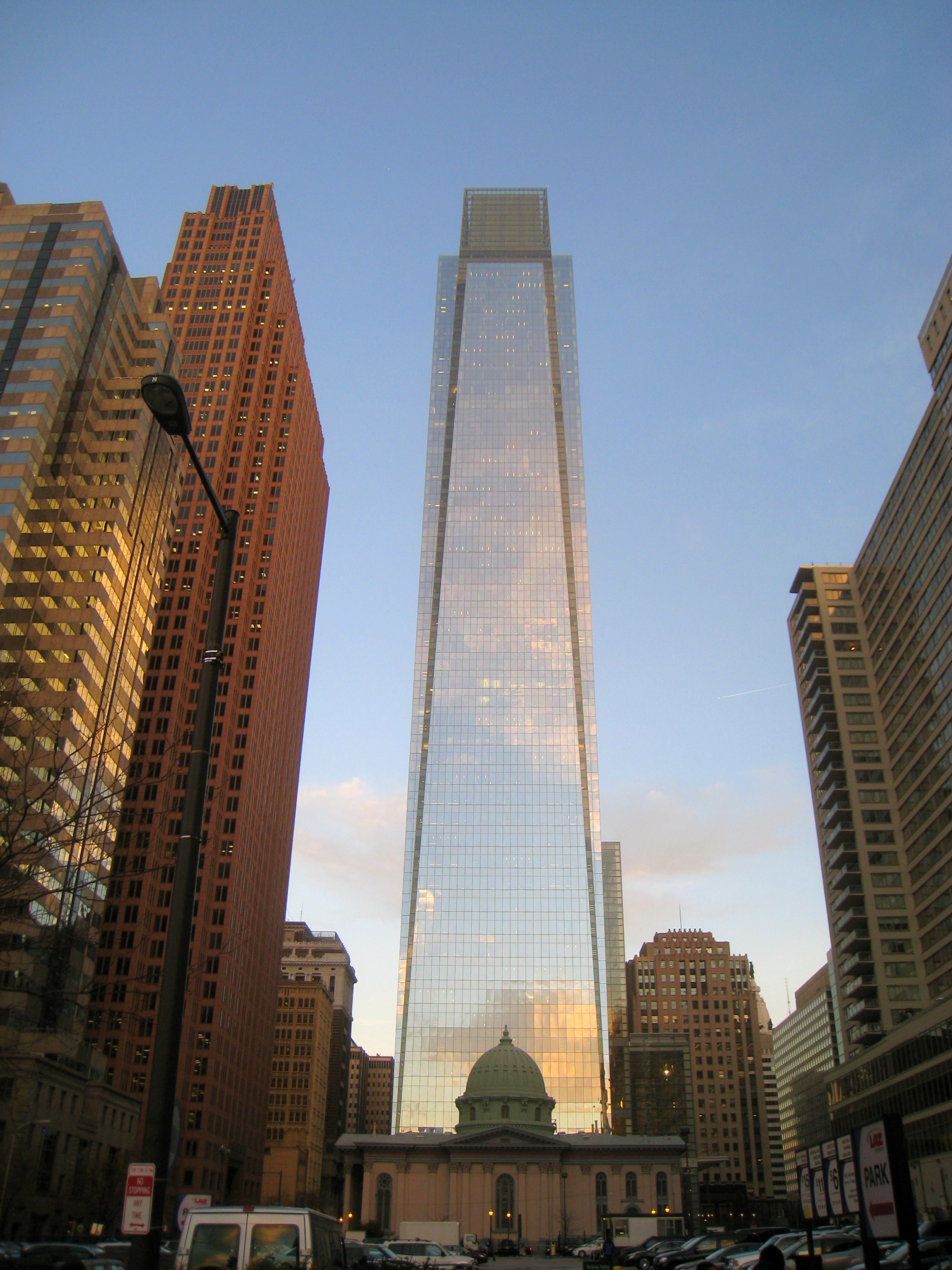
Looking east from 19th Street, with the Comcast Center towering over the church.
