= Congress Hall (Cape May hotel) =

Building in New Jersey, US

Coordinates: 38.9314°N 74.9243°W

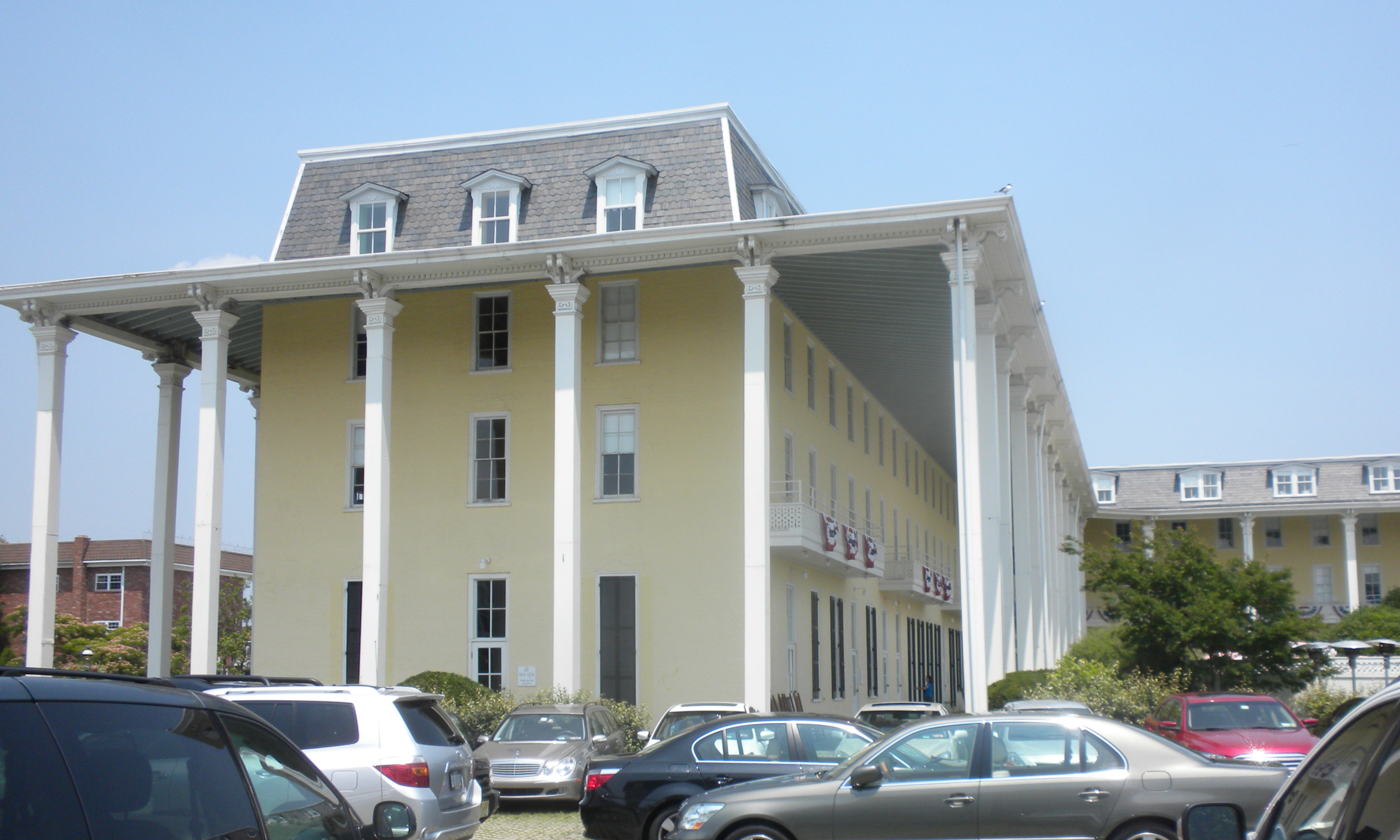
- Interactive map of the Congress Hall area

General information
- Location: 251 Beach Avenue, Cape May, New Jersey, USA
- Opening: 1816 (rebuilt 1879)

Website
- caperesorts.com/congress-hall/

Congress Hall is a historic hotel in Cape May, Cape May County, New Jersey, United States, occupying a city block bordered on the south by Beach Avenue and on the east by Washington Street Mall. It is a contributing building in the Cape May National Historic District.

Congress Hall was first constructed in 1816 as a wooden boarding house for guests to the new seaside resort of Cape May; and the proprietor, Thomas H. Hughes, called it "The Big House." Locals, thinking it too big to be successful, called it "Tommy's Folly." In 1828, when Hughes was elected to the House of Representatives, he changed the name of the hotel to Congress Hall. It burned to the ground in Cape May's Great Fire of 1878, but within a year, its owners had rebuilt the hotel in brick in an effort to convince leery prospective guests that the building was fireproof.

While serving as President of the United States, Franklin Pierce, James Buchanan, Ulysses S. Grant and Benjamin Harrison vacationed at Congress Hall, and Harrison made Congress Hall his official Summer White House, becoming the center of state business for several months each year. John Philip Sousa regularly visited Congress Hall with the United States Marine Band and composed the "Congress Hall March", which he conducted on its lawn in the summer of 1882.

A Stroll along Beach Avenue, Cape May, New Jersey video (3:35)

During the 20th century, the Cape May seafront deteriorated, with tourists heading to other shore resorts. In 1968, Congress Hall was purchased by the Rev. Carl McIntire and became part of his Cape May Bible Conference. McIntire's possession of the property preserved the hotel during a period in which many Victorian-era beachfront hotels were demolished for the value of their land.

With the decline of the Bible Conference, Congress Hall fell into a state of disrepair, with the hotel closing in 1992, though retail space in the building remained in use. The property was partially restored under the guidance of Curtis Bashaw, McIntire's grandson, a $22 million restoration began in 1995 and completed in 2002. Congress Hall is a resort hotel and part of the Cape Resorts family of hotels.

Bashaw supplies the hotel and many of its restaurants with pork, eggs and vegetables from his 73-acre (30 ha) Beach Plum Farm in West Cape May, New Jersey.

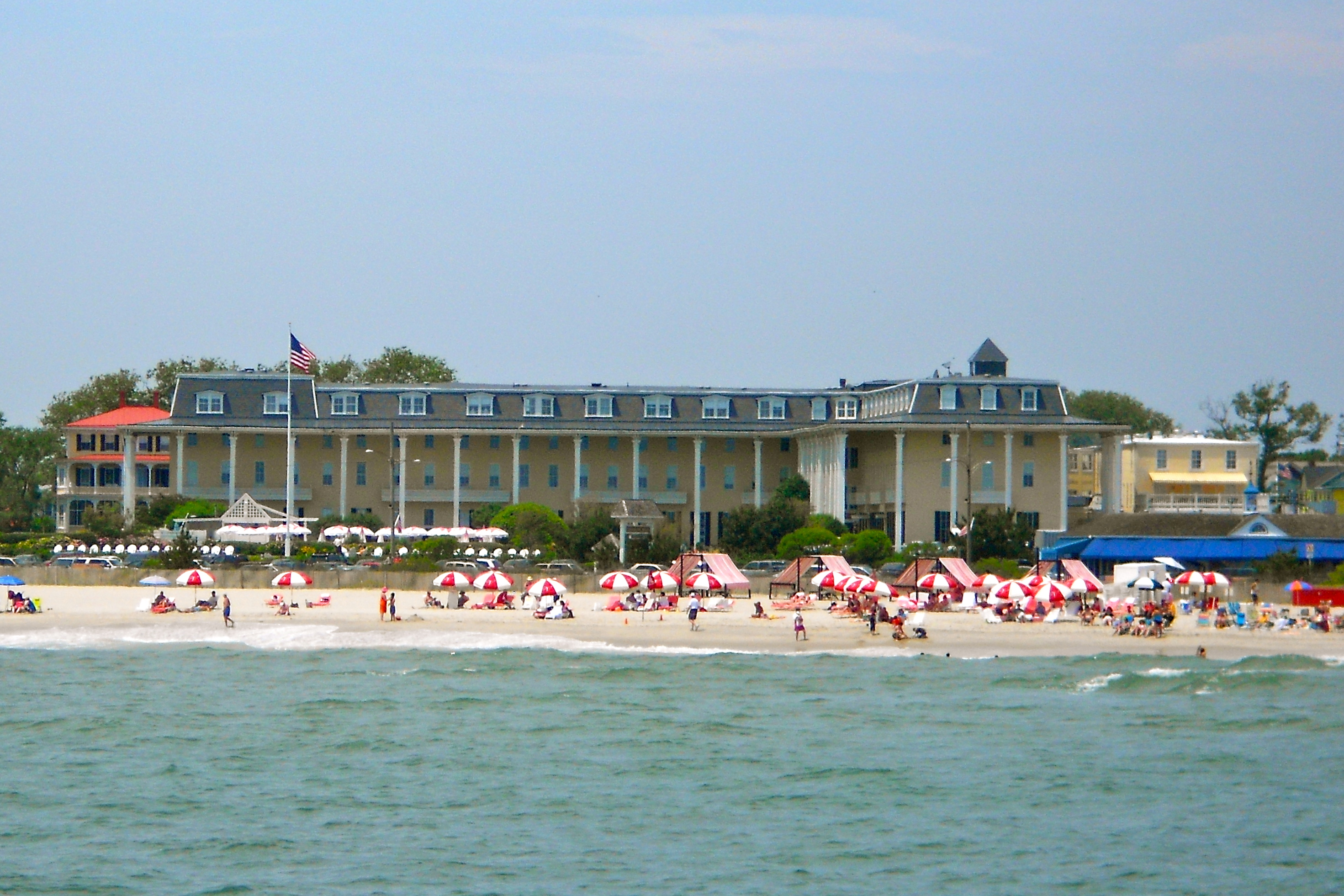
Congress Hotel from the sea

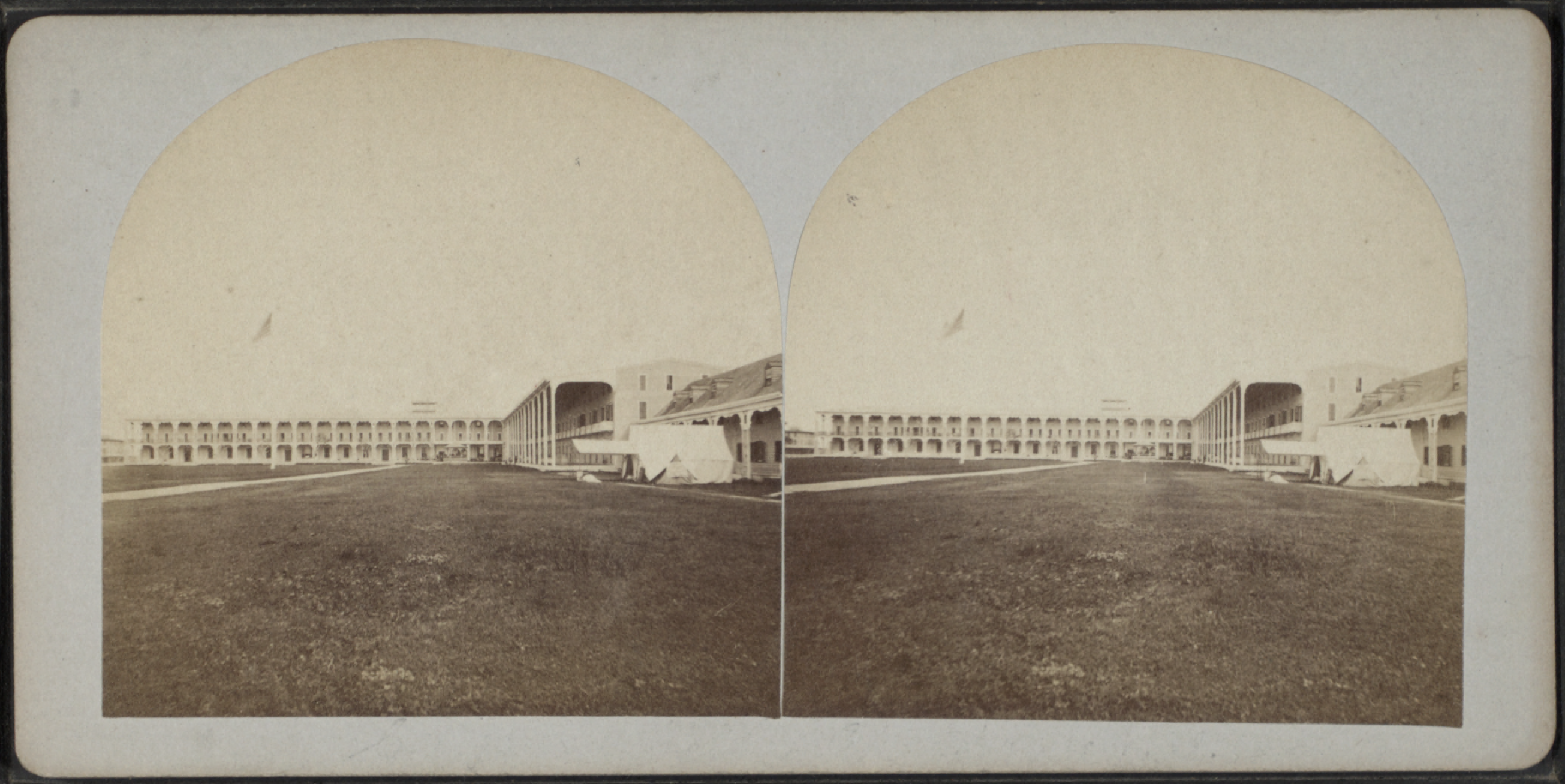
Congress Hall in 1870

== See also ==
- Cape May Historic District
- List of residences of presidents of the United States
