= San Francisco Brewing Company =

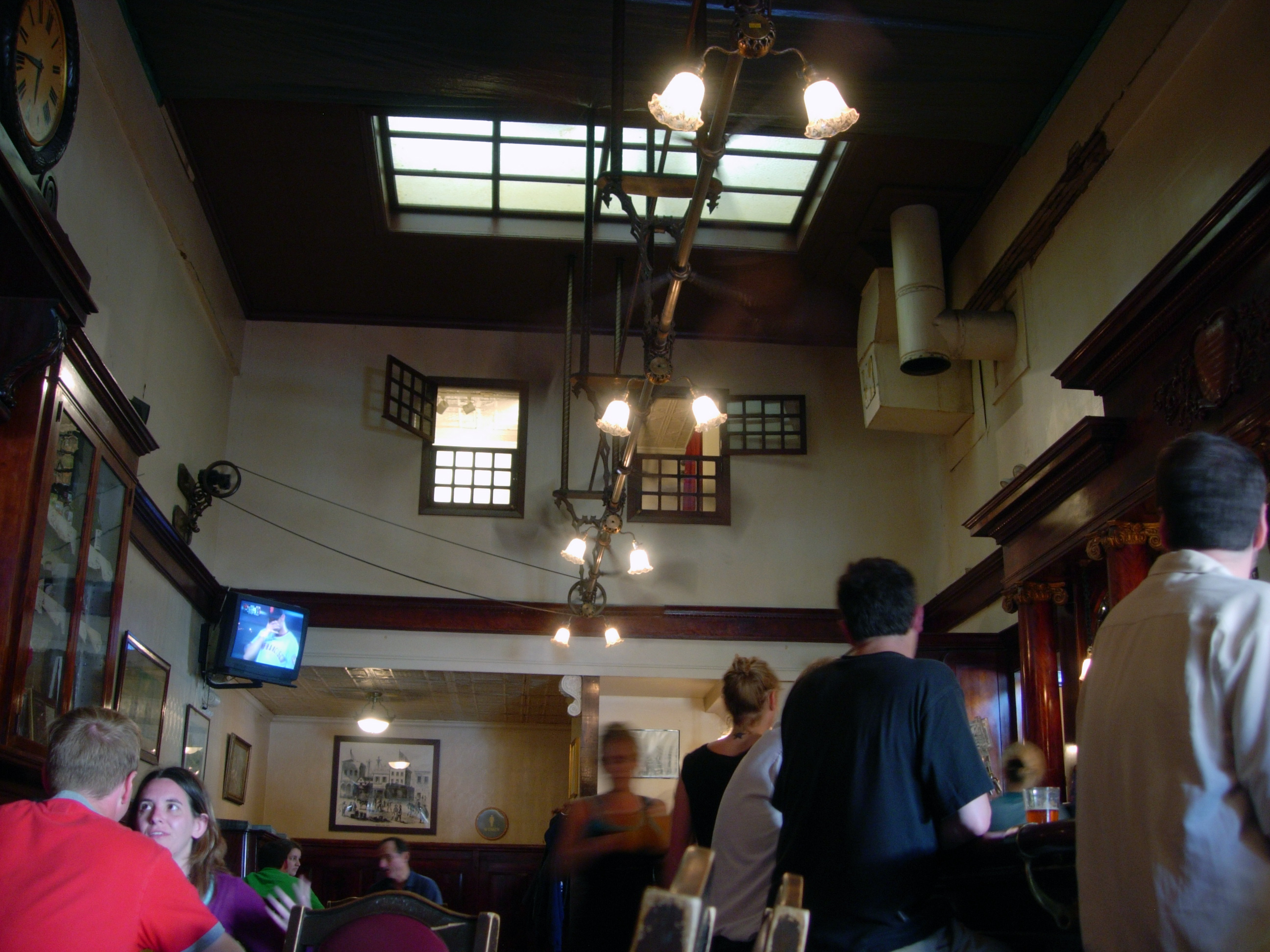
San Francisco Brewing Company in 2006

The San Francisco Brewing Company was one of the oldest micro-breweries and bars in San Francisco, in addition to being one of the first four brew pubs in the United States. It was not always known as the Brewing Company, as only in recent decades did it take the moniker. It was located on the edge of what was once known as the Barbary Coast, at the intersection of Columbus and Pacific Avenues. It was formerly known as the Andromeda Saloon and the Albatross Saloon.

== History ==
The pub originally opened in 1907 as the Andromeda Saloon, where "angling executives, sharp-talking politicians and homesick sailors all rubbed elbows while brazen prostitutes flaunted coquettish charms at the brass rail of the ornate bar." In 1913, the Andromeda gained wide respect when Jack Dempsey, the future heavyweight champion, gained employment there. It is even rumored that, in 1939, Baby Face Nelson was captured in the pub by the FBI.

During Prohibition the Andromeda Saloon was one of very few pubs that survived, and it did so by calling itself the Andromeda Cafe – which provided classy seafood fare such as fresh oysters and clams, all the while still serving alcohol discreetly.

Decades later, in 1977, the brew pub was renovated and renamed the Albatross Saloon, and gained notoriety among San Francisco bars for its rich history. The bar itself was the original solid plank of mahogany used during its Barbary Coast days, and the vintage fan system run by leather belts and pulleys has remained in operation from its construction in 1916 until today in its most recent incarnation.

Allan G. Paul, while living on Telegraph Hill, developed an obsession with Barbary Coast history and unique, micro-brewed beer. Paul bought the Albatross Saloon in 1985 and renamed it the San Francisco Brewing Company. It still housed all the historical pieces from its early days, but had his addition of antique-style micro-brewing, which brought beer in brass pipes straight from the basement, where it fermented and self-carbonated, into a pint glass.

Tours of the pub, its famous Dempsey Room, and the brewery itself were given upon request. The Brewing Company had live music from classic jazz combos to blues and even more modern and avant-garde performances every Thursday through Saturday. Some of its chief attractions were the oddly humored brew titles, which included the Bock Obama, the Albatross Lager, and the Hugh Hefnerweizen.

The San Francisco Brewing Company closed in November 2009 due to financial issues but, as of April 2010, has since been remodeled and reestablished under new ownership as the Comstock Saloon.

In late 2012, Brew-master and new owner Joshua Leavy started up the brand and brewing again under the name San Francisco Brewing Co. They have put out four beers in two years and are serving their beers all over the Bay Area today.

== See also ==
- California breweries
- Beer in the United States
