= Historic bars and saloons in San Francisco =

Historic bars and saloons in San Francisco were some of the earliest businesses during the formation of the city. Many of the first businesses to spring up in San Francisco during the California Gold Rush era (1848–1855) supported the influx of new men, including bars and saloons, breweries, horse racing tracks, and others forms of entertainment.

During the second half of the 19th and early 20th centuries in San Francisco, the Barbary Coast red-light district was formed in a nine block area of the city, centered on a three block stretch of Pacific Street, now Pacific Avenue, between Montgomery and Stockton Streets. The Barbary Coast was home to dance halls, concert saloons, bars, jazz clubs, variety shows, and brothels.

== The Old Ship Saloon (1851) ==
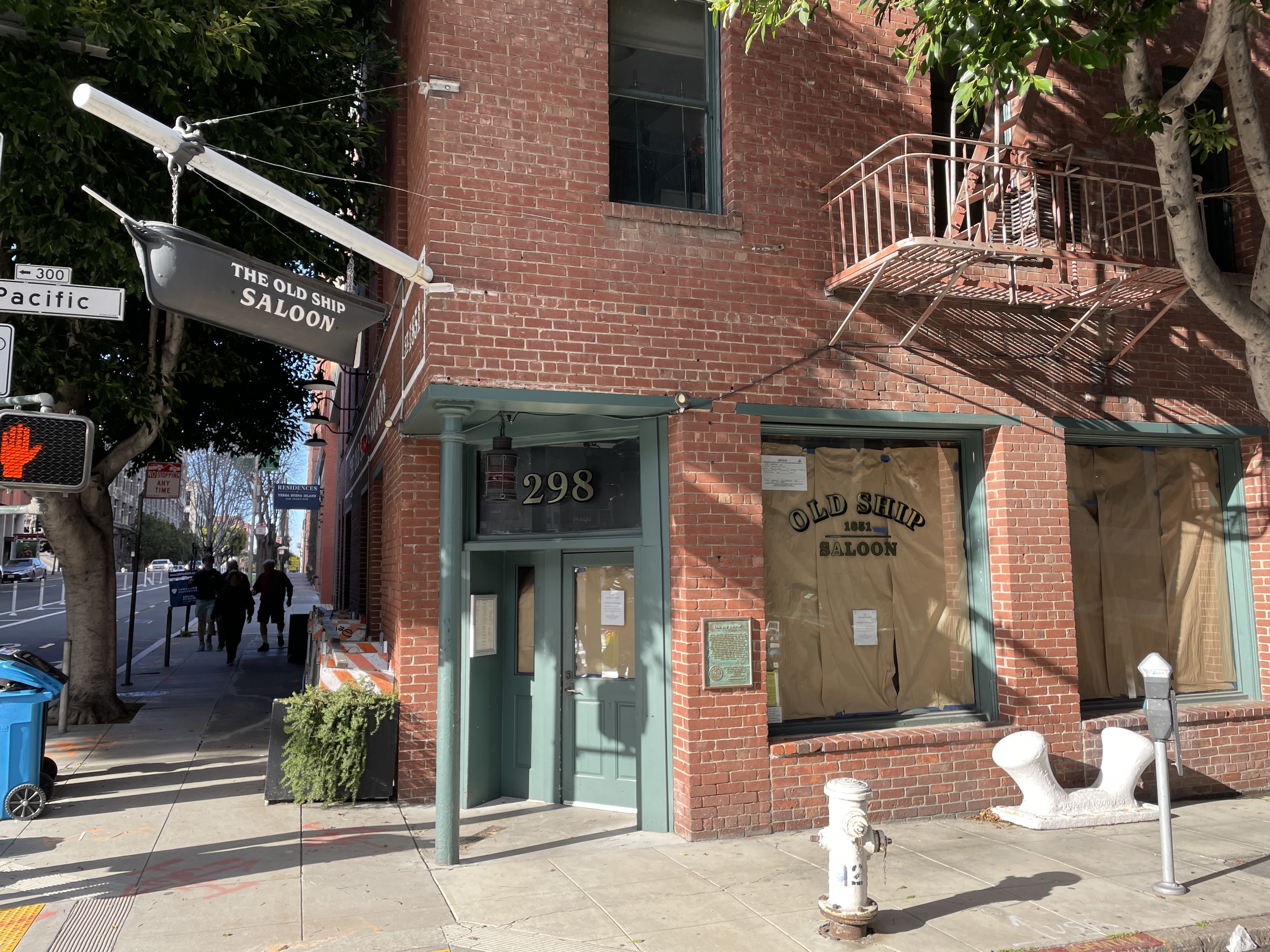
The Old Ship Saloon (in 2023)

The Old Ship Saloon, formerly the Old Ship Alehouse, was built in 1851 around the ruins of a California Gold Rush-era ship named the Arkansas. For the first 8 years, the ship existed as a floating saloon. It is located in the Jackson Square neighborhood and is part of the Barbary Coast Trail.

== Elixir (1858) ==
A historic bar located at 3200 16th Street at Guerrero Street in San Francisco's Mission District neighborhood. It was opened by Francis Daneal, as a Wild West at a time when the neighborhood sidewalks were made of wooden planks. Over the years it has held many different roles within the neighborhood including as an Irish working-man’s place, a sailor bar, a shot-and-a-beer dive bar, a gay Latino hangout, a dingy dive, and as a beer bar. It is on its 11th proprietor, H. Joseph Ehrmann, as of 2003. The interior of the bar is of the Victorian-era and tends to have a dark atmosphere, since around 2003 the bar specializes in elaborate cocktails.

== The Saloon (1861) ==
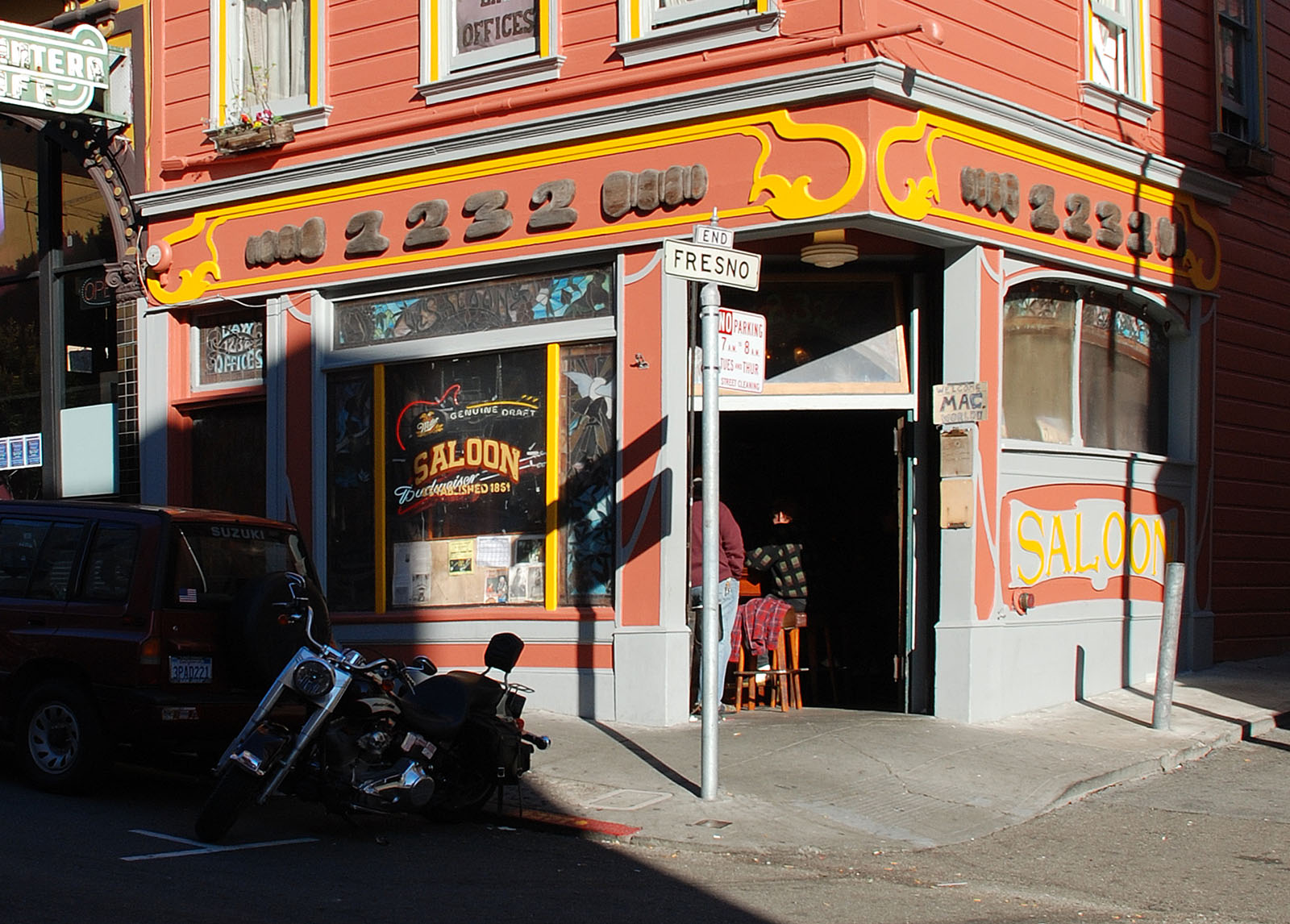
The Saloon in North Beach (in 2009)

The Saloon is located at 1232 Grant Avenue in the North Beach neighborhood. Originally named the Wagner's Beer Hall at 308 Dupont Street, the street was later renamed Grant Avenue and the address numbers were changed.

== Northstar Cafe (1882) ==
A historic bar located at 1560 Powell Street in San Francisco's North Beach neighborhood. During Prohibition, the Northstar Cafe operated as a speakeasy. In the modern era, it operates as a sports bar with affordable drinks and popcorn.

== Shotwells (1891) ==
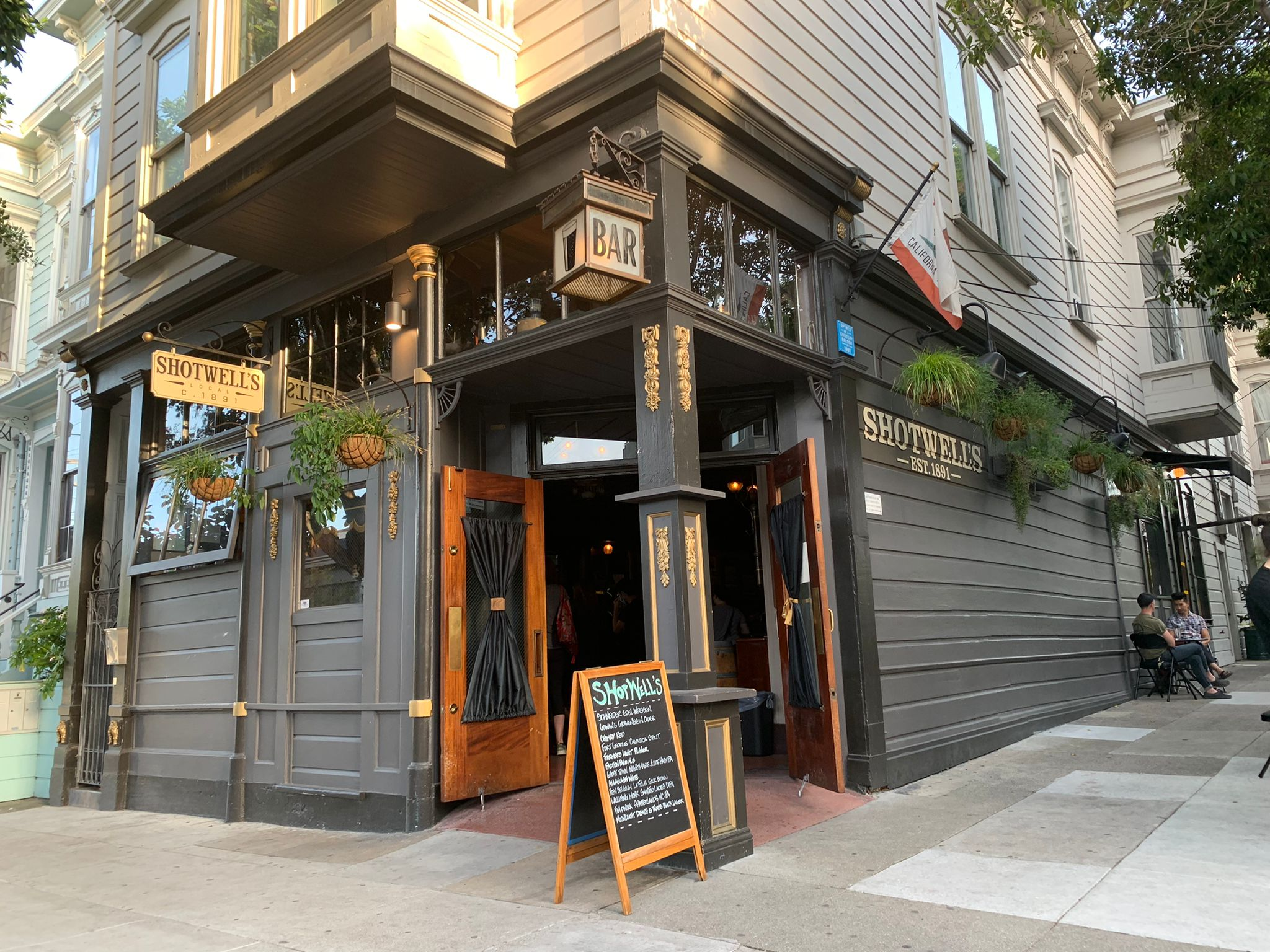
Shotwell's Saloon in San Francisco's Mission district

A historic bar located at 3349 20th Street in San Francisco's Mission District neighborhood. It was founded by two German immigrants as a neighborhood grocery store with a backroom "grog shop".

== The Little Shamrock (1893) ==
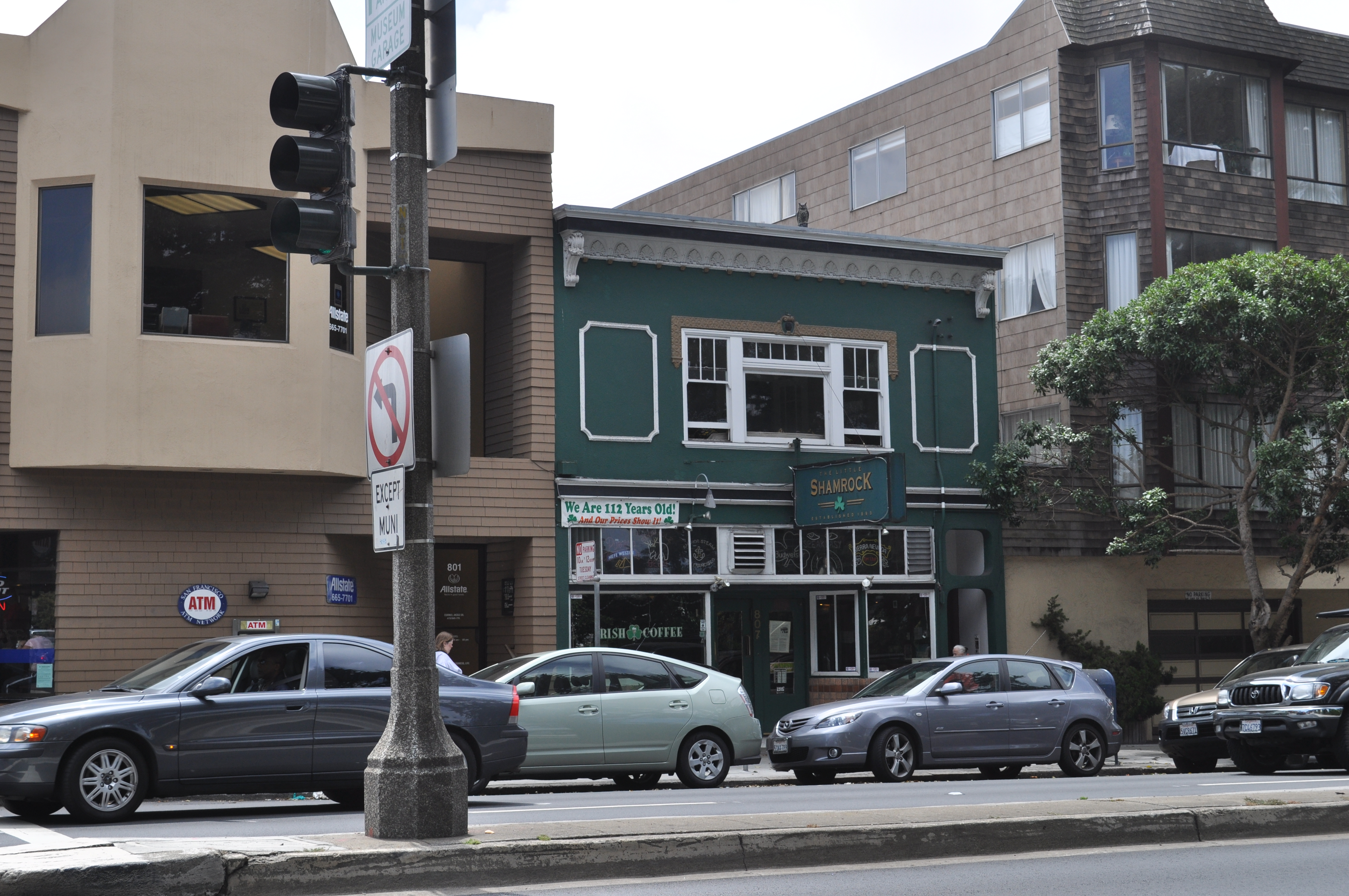
The Little Shamrock (in 2009)

A historic bar located at 807 Lincoln Way on the West Side of San Francisco, in the Inner Sunset neighborhood. It was constructed for the California Midwinter International Exposition (1894), to serve the workmen. The bar was opened on October 28, 1893, by Julie and Antone Herzo.

== Bus Stop Saloon (1900) ==
A historic bar located at 1901 Union Street in San Francisco's Cow Hollow neighborhood. It was founded as “The Alley”. The sports bar saloon has been run by a single family for four generations and over a hundred years, the Ferroni family. In 2023, the Ferroni family opened a second floor upscale cocktail lounge.

== The Homestead (1906) ==
A historic bar located at 2301 Folsom Street in San Francisco's Mission District neighborhood. Built in 1902 by Charles Scharenberg and opened in 1906, originally named "Old Homestead." During prohibition (1920–1933) it served lunch foods, and secretly functioned as a speakeasy and brothel. Fanny Pearl, a well-known madam owned the building during the prohibition.

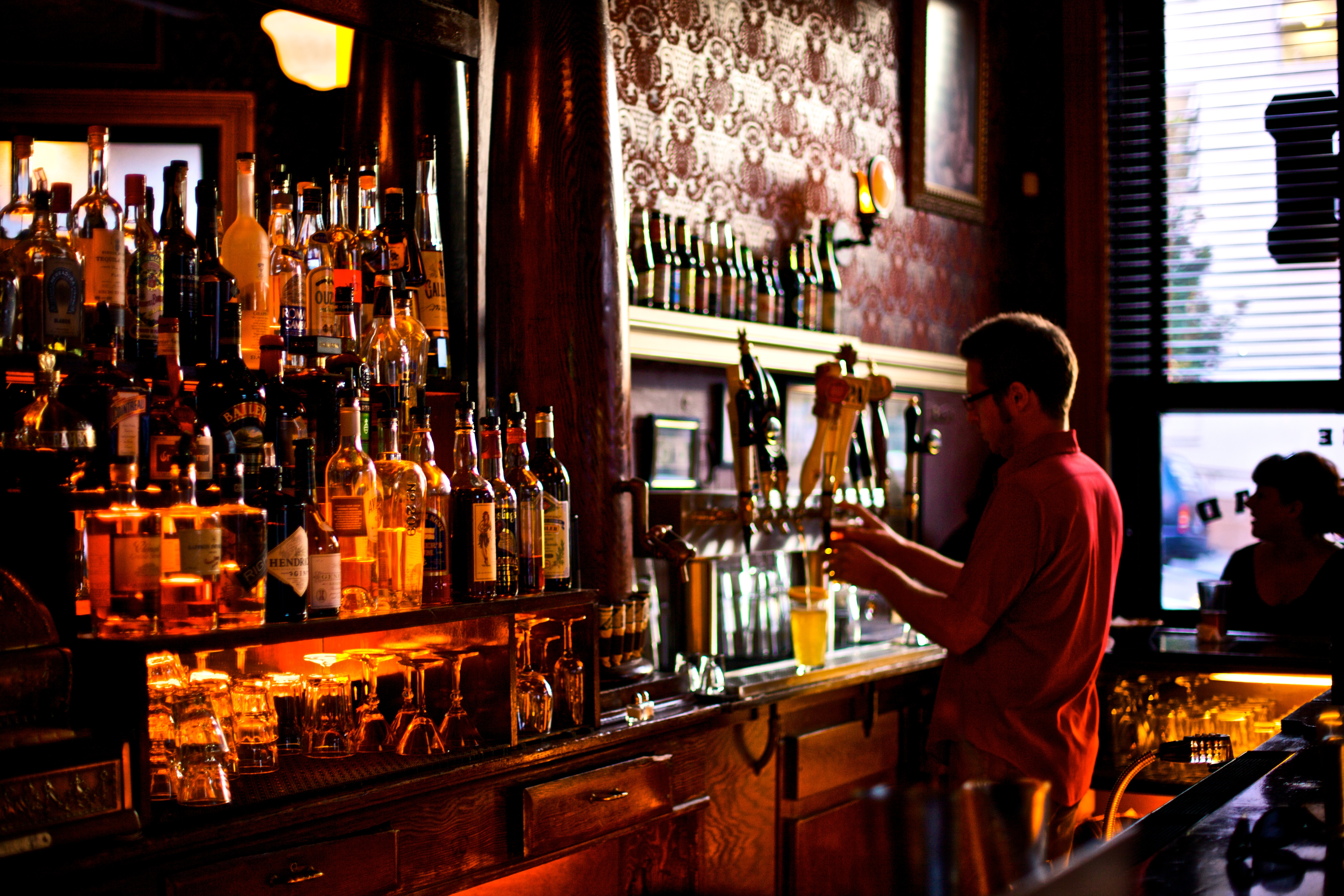
The Homestead historic bar includes a period cash register (in 2009)

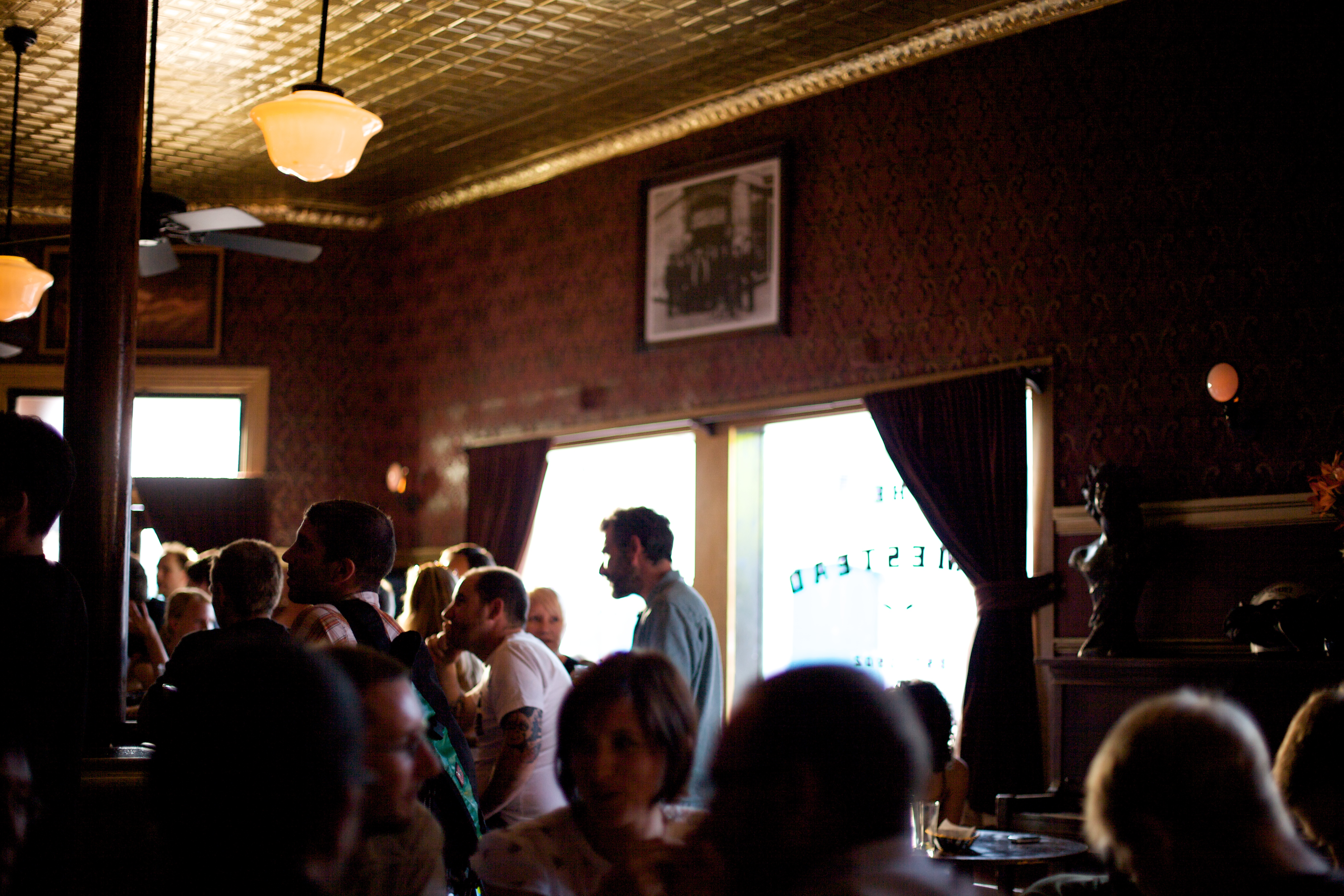
The Homestead has restored period details, like velvet flocked wallpaper and stamped metal ceiling tiles (in 2009)

== Cafe Du Nord (1906) ==
Historic bar and music venue, located at 2174 Market Street in the Upper Market neighborhood of San Francisco. It is in the basement level of the Swedish American Hall.

== Comstock Saloon (1907) ==
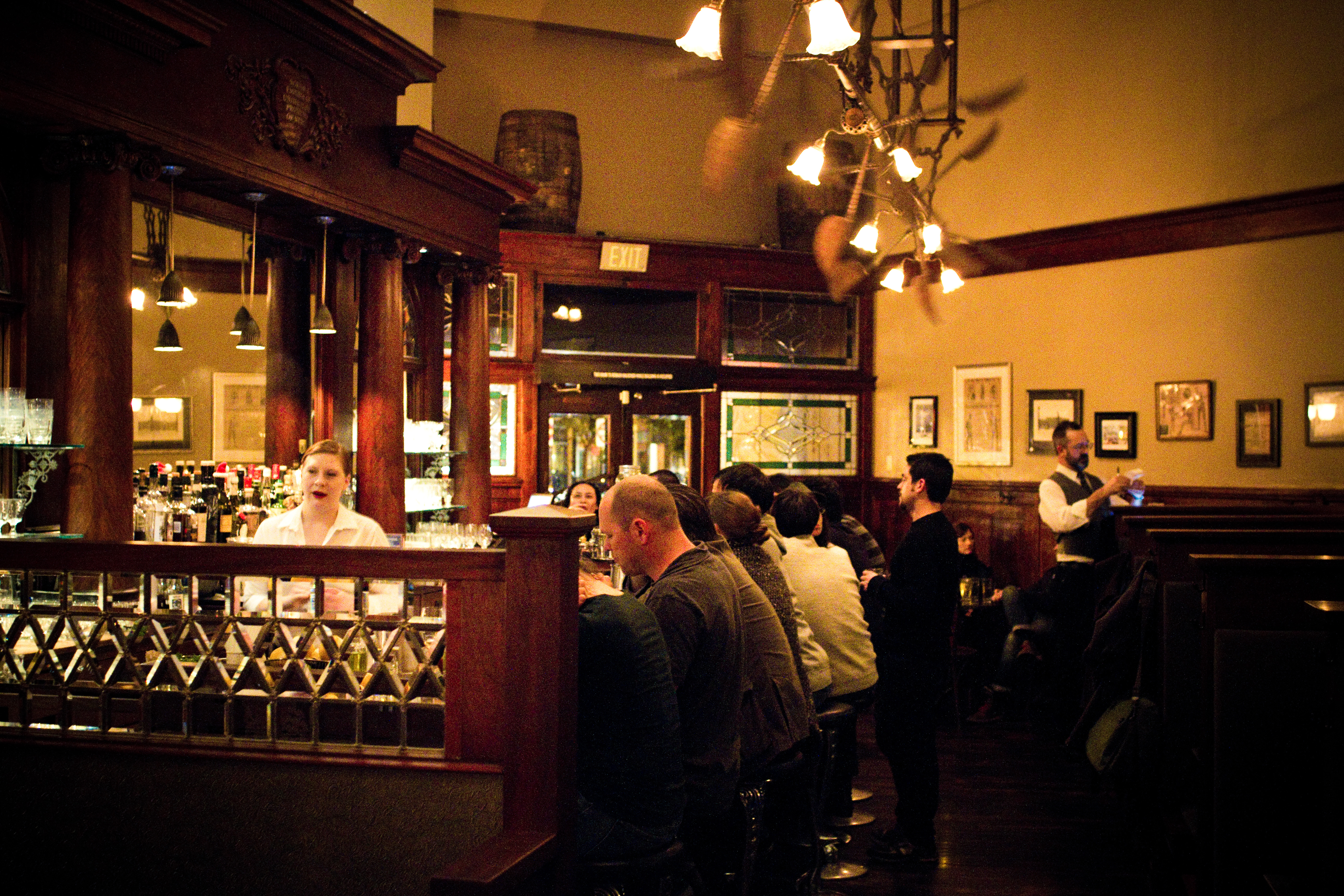
Comstock Saloon (in 2012)

A historic saloon located at 155 Columbus Ave in San Francisco's North Beach.

== Hotel Utah Saloon (1908) ==
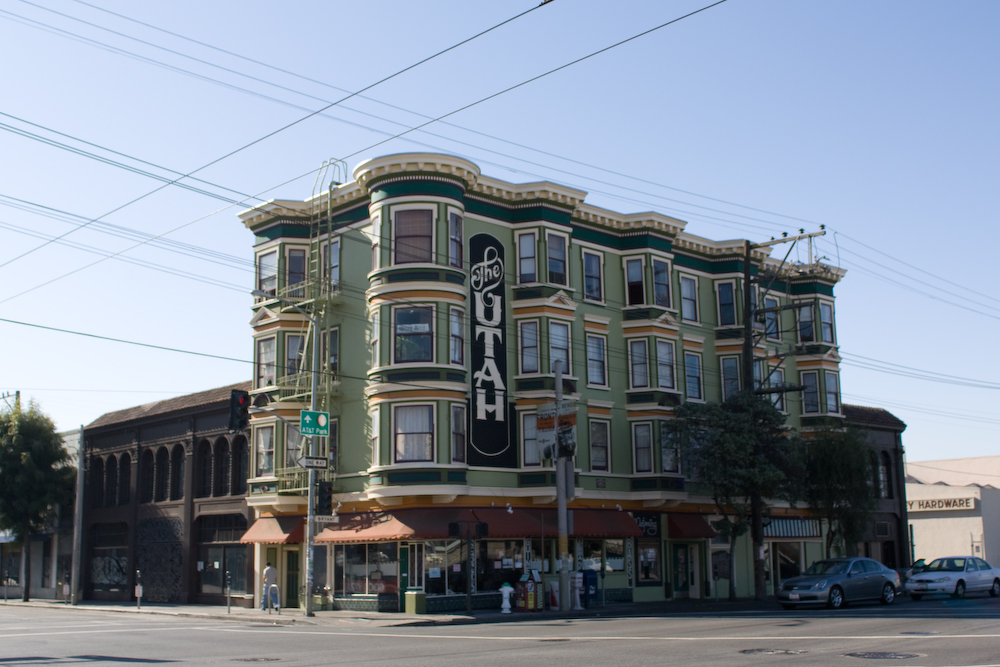
Hotel Utah (in 2008)

A historic mixed-use building known as a saloon bar, live music venue, and residential hotel, located at 500–504 4th Street in the South of Market neighborhood.

== House of Shields (1908) ==
A historic bar located at 39 New Montgomery Street in the Financial District of San Francisco.

== Double Play Bar and Grill (1909–2022) ==
A historic sports bar located at 2401-16th Street in San Francisco's Mission District neighborhood. The bar was strategically placed near the former Seals Stadium (1931–1959). In 2022, the bar was destroyed by a fire and was forced to close.

== See also ==
- Heinold's First and Last Chance Saloon (1883), historic waterfront saloon in Oakland, California
- Peninsula Mile Houses
- List of dive bars
