= International Settlement (San Francisco) =

Coordinates: 37°47′50″N 122°24′14″W

Pacific Street, looking west, from Montgomery Street, 1940s.

Pal Joey film trailer

International Settlement was a relatively short lived entertainment district within San Francisco, located along a one block stretch of Pacific Avenue between Kearny and Montgomery Streets, whose popularity lasted from 1939 to 1960.

== History ==
Pacific Avenue went through many transformations since its early days of the 1860s when it was a main thoroughfare for the vice-ridden Barbary Coast, and was then lined with brothels and violent saloons. International Settlement was the third major transformation of the Pacific Street district of San Francisco.

=== Early Pacific Street and the Barbary Coast ===
During the late 19th and early 20th-centuries within San Francisco, the Barbary Coast was a red-light district which contained dance halls, concert saloons, bars, jazz clubs, variety shows, and brothels. The Barbary Coast was the first transformation of Pacific Street, and was born during the California Gold Rush of 1849 when the population of San Francisco was growing at an exponential rate due to a rapid influx of tens of thousands of miners trying to find gold. The early decades of the Barbary Coast would be marred by persistent lawlessness, gambling, administrative graft, vigilante justice, and prostitution.

Pacific Street received its second transformation after the earthquake and fire of 1906, when most of its buildings were destroyed. The city's financial boosters then invested heavily in reconstruction and within three months over a dozen dance halls and a dozen bars were rebuilt and operating. This era of Pacific Street was nicknamed 'Terrific Street' by musicians in describing the quality of music at Pacific Street's clubs, and indeed the first jazz clubs of San Francisco would occur there. This new transformation of Pacific Street was gentrified and tame compared to the lawless pre-earthquake version of the Barbary Coast, and Terrific Street became a tourist mecca for middle-class youth. Archived photos of Terrific Street's clubs like Spider Kelly's show neatly dressed couples enjoying a harmless night of dancing.

However Terrific Street's dominance was short lived, and would slowly come to an end by 1921 after the momentum of a reform movement and a newspaper's crusade caused dancing and women to be forbidden from its many dance halls and cafes. The final blow to Terrific Street's popularity came when Prohibition was passed in 1920 and stopped the flow of alcohol to its dance halls and saloons. After prohibition that block lost much excitement and its dance halls and cabarets were gradually replaced by offices, hotels, and warehouses.

=== Pacific Street after the end of Prohibition ===
After Prohibition was repealed in 1933 and liquor was again available, an attempt was made to revive its entertainment scene. Restaurateur and capitalist, Pierino Gavello, initiated Pacific Street's third transformation and was responsible for starting the enterprise to redevelop the block between Montgomery and Kearney streets back into an entertainment district. The buildings were stream-lined with stucco facades and gleaming windows, and the block was renamed as International Settlement in an attempt to attract the servicemen of World War II. To further revitalize its entertainment business, two pairs of towers were constructed, on either end of that Pacific Avenue block, and those towers would support two large signs overhead which read: International Settlement. A number of African American jazz bands played at these night spots, and continued Pacific Street's involvement with America's jazz scene.

The saloons, wine dens, and dance halls of the old Barbary Coast era would now be replaced with restaurants and night clubs. Some of the night clubs and restaurants of International Settlement were the Arabian Nights cocktail lounge (592 Pacific), the Gay 'N Frisky club (590 Pacific), House of Pisco (580 Pacific), Monaco (560 Pacific), The Barn (539 Pacific), The Hurricane (533 Pacific), the Lucca restaurant, House of Blue Lights, Spider Kelly's, Moulin Rouge, Sahara Sands, Pago Pago, and the Barbary Coast club with its iconic can-can dancer's leg neon sign.

Bee and Ray Goman's Gay ‘90s was at 555 Pacific Avenue, which was the site of a former Hippodrome (later as Moulin Rouge) dance hall from the Barbary Coast days. It currently houses an art store, and its basement still displays an old tunnel from its past.

During 1957, the International Settlement received national exposure when the Frank Sinatra and Kim Novak film Pal Joey's exteriors were shot on that block. In the film Frank Sinatra plays an unemployed singer who comes to International Settlement's clubs in search of work, and we see him walk the block and enter a number of those actual clubs. That film provides one of the best film records of the International Settlement during the 1950s, and photo outtakes are available on websites.

However, by the late 1950s the area had lost its appeal again and began to have its dance halls and cabarets replaced by offices and warehouses. International Settlement had now become too old-fashioned to compete with the nearby and escalating Broadway and North Beach entertainment scenes. They consisted of jazz clubs, comedy clubs, and strip clubs which were much racier than the old-time chorus girl acts of International Settlement.

Though that Pacific Avenue block now appears as a sleepy little street and its two large International Settlement signs have been taken down, the paired towers still remain.

== International Settlement today ==
Currently the neighborhood is populated with interior design firms, law offices, a movie theater, and an art store inside the Old Hippodrome dance hall, which later housed the Moulin Rouge dance hall. The area is also included on the historical Barbary Coast Trail in San Francisco.

== Popular culture ==
- In the 1950 anti-communist propaganda film, The Woman on Pier 13, International Settlement is shown as William Talman and Laraine Day's characters visit a nightclub. The scene opens with a wide shot of the street and the lit up "International Settlement" sign is prominently displayed, as cars pass under it. The image fades away as another gradually appears, it shows a close up of some of the neon nightclub signs (including "Bee & Ray Goman's Gay '90s" and the famous "Barbary Coast" leg). The next image is a close up of the neon sign for a nightclub called "Gay Paree".
- Footage of the International Settlement can be seen in the TV police drama, The Lineup, Episode "The Assault Case" (May 6, 1955)
- The 1957 film Pal Joey, starring Frank Sinatra and Kim Novak, begins in the International Settlement, also prominently featured.

== See also ==
- Jackson Square
- Red Light Abatement Act
