= The Little Shamrock =

Coordinates: 37.765717°N 122.466719°W

The Little Shamrock is a historic bar located in the Inner Sunset District on the West Side of San Francisco, California. Established in 1893, it is considered the city's second-oldest bar after The Saloon in North Beach, which opened in 1861.

== History ==
The saloon was founded at its current location on H Street (today's 807 Lincoln Way at the intersection with 9th Avenue) by Irish entrepreneur Julia Herzo Quigley and her first husband Antone Herzo to serve visitors and builders during the construction of the California Midwinter International Exposition of 1894 in Golden Gate Park. In 1924, it was extended with a parapet in Mission Revival style. It remained open through Prohibition by converting into a soft-drink parlor and serving alcohol in its back room.

The Little Shamrock is one of the 100 legacy bars and restaurants listed by non-profit San Francisco Architectural Heritage as "iconic establishments that contribute to the culture, character, and lore of San Francisco." It is prominently featured in John Lescroart's Dismas Hardy novel series, with Moses McGuire as its fictional owner and bartender.

== See also ==
- Historic bars and saloons in San Francisco
