= Arturo Islas =

American novelist (1938–1991)

Arturo Islas, Jr.
- Born: May 24, 1938; El Paso, Texas
- Died: February 15, 1991 (aged 52); Stanford University Campus Home
- Occupation: Novelist
- Writing career
- Genre: Chicano Literature
- Notable work: The Rain God Migrant Souls
- Notable awards: Border Regional Library Association's Southwest Book Award
- Literary movement: Chicano

Arturo Islas Jr. (May 25, 1938 – February 15, 1991) was an English professor and novelist from El Paso, Texas, whose writing focused on the experience of Chicano cultural duality.

He received three degrees from Stanford: a B.A. in 1960, a Masters in 1963 and a Ph.D. in 1971, when he joined the Stanford faculty. Islas was one of the first Chicanos in the United States to earn a Ph.D. in English. In 1976, he became the first Chicano faculty member to receive tenure at Stanford.

Islas died on February 15, 1991, from complications related to AIDS.

== Early life and education ==
Fleeing the Mexican Revolution, Islas' father and paternal grandparents crossed the United-States-Mexico border to live in El Paso, Texas, in 1910. Islas' grandmother, Crecenciana, was a teacher who devoted much of her time to disciplining and educating her children, teaching them to read, write and speak fluent English, enabling Islas' father, Arturo Islas Sr., became a police officer in a largely white police force, and passing onto Arturo Jr. and his cousins a deep connection with learning. Arturo Sr. and Jovita Islas had three sons altogether; Mario Islas became a priest in Liberia, and Luis Islas became at attorney in El Paso.

Despite a life-threatening polio attack during childhood that left him with a permanent limp, Islas was a good student, and graduated as valedictorian of his class from El Paso Public High School in 1956, beginning undergraduate studies at Stanford University in Palo Alto in the fall of the same year. Islas initially intended to be a pre-med student in order to follow a career as a neurosurgeon. However, after his first biology and chemistry classes resulted in B's, Islas decided to study humanities instead, where he was receiving A's and excelling in his coursework. Islas ultimately became an English major, and sources differ on whether he minored in French Literature or religious studies. Islas received several honors for his success in his study of literature, eventually being elected to the Phi Beta Kappa Honor Society and receiving several awards for creative writing. After completing his B.A. in 1960, Islas went on to earn both a master's degree (1963) and Ph.D. (1971) in English from Stanford.

== Later life and career ==
After completing his Ph.D. in 1971, Arturo immediately joined the faculty of Stanford University in the English department. He was the chair of the Faculty Recruitment Committee, adviser to Chicano undergraduates and fellows, and co-director of the Stanford Center for Chicano Research. He taught classes focusing on the English language and minority groups, and a class entitled "Chicano Themes", the first such class to be taught in Stanford's English Department. He received the Dinkelspiel Award for Undergraduate Teaching Excellence in 1976. In the same year, he was promoted to associate professor, thereby becoming Stanford's first tenured Chicano professor. In 1977, Islas took a sabbatical to finish writing Dia de los Muertos, the novel that would be published as The Rain God in 1984. The novel was awarded the best fiction prize from the Border Regional Library Conference in 1985 and was selected by the Bay Area Reviewers Association as one of the three best novels of 1984. In 1986, Islas became a full professor at Stanford University and began to write Migrant Souls, a sequel to The Rain God that was published in 1991. He had planned the books to be part of a trilogy and was working on the final book, La Mollie and the King of Tears, when he died. The novel was published posthumously.

== Personal life ==
Islas lived with Jay Spears until they broke up in 1970. Islas learned in 1985 that Spears was in hospital with AIDS, from which he died in 1986. Islas himself died of complications related to AIDS on 15 February 1991 at his campus home.

== Writing style ==
Islas wrote and published in several genres, but is best known for his two finished novels, The Rain God and Migrant Souls. Both of these books depict the Angel family, who live in the border region of the United States. Islas believed deeply in writing about the Chicano experience in America to "help make visible Chicano/a creative expression and [the] struggle against institutional and individual racist acts", and encouraged his Chicano/a students to write from their own heritage and experience. Islas consistently used autobiographical details in his novels, particularly in the form of the character Miguel, who attends college in California and struggles with serious health issues, as Islas did for most of his life. Islas also wrote local stories about El Paso into his work, and his disciplinarian grandmother, Crecenciana, appears in the form of Mama Chona.

One scholar wrote that "[The Rain God] is a fictional autobiography because it is, first and foremost, the protagonist's own account of how the Angel family shaped his self-identity." In general, The Rain God uses a third person narrator who, through indirect discourse, is deeply sympathetic with and self-conscious of his connection to the main character, connecting the writer to the protagonist. In other works like La Mollie and the King of Tears, Islas uses a first-person narrator who speaks in dialect to reinforce the influence of personal experience on the work. In both cases, the impact of Islas' heritage on the form and style of his work is plain. While not an exact retelling of his life, Islas' depictions of the Angel family place him in the category of contemporary semi-autobiographical Chicano/a writers from working-class backgrounds who have transcended language barriers to include Chicano/as in the class of educated, published people.

== Literary themes ==
=== Borders ===
Many of Islas's works center on the conflict of borders. His works are frequently set in border towns and explore the dynamic scenes, perceptions, and situations that occur when two cultures meet on the United States/Mexico border. As is common in Chicano literature, Islas critiques the stereotypes involved with the association of white and American with civilized as well as dark and Mexican with tribal and uncivilized. He discusses the rifts this causes in border town communities, especially in some of his earlier short stories, and continues to expand on the topic in his later novels such as The Rain God. Economic disparities are also observed, as Islas compares the Anglo elite with the impoverishment of the Mexicans. He further looks at borders and Chicano identity through an examination of language, making distinctions between Castilian Spanish, Mexican Spanish, and English. He identifies the advantages of bilingualism in the United States, the stereotypes associated with Mexican Spanish, and how the different forms of language contribute to the establishment of personal identity.

=== Sexuality ===
The exploration of sexuality is very prevalent in Islas's works as he looks at the topic in relation to the Chicano community. In "Poor Little Lamb" Islas looks at the role of machismo culture. He casts the protagonist as the non-macho son who defies the will and expectations of his very macho father by breaking through the stereotypes of masculinity in Chicano culture. The idea of sexual repression through culture is present in Islas's more well-known works as well. In The Rain God, the Ángel family lives in a highly structured, patriarchal community in which homosexuality is not viewed as valid and the topic remains unspoken. This is evident in the language used. Throughout the book, the word "homosexual" appears just once, and the characters choose to use more ambiguous terms such as "queer" and "joto" which allude to homosexuality without explicitly stating it. Moreover, The Rain God shows sexual repression through religion. The Ángel family is very Catholic: a religion which denies the validity of any sexuality besides heterosexuality. "Rather than define a homosexual presence within the family, which would mean confronting the truth, the Ángel clan rely on their fear and shame of it to accommodate the illusion that it does not exist in their home or lives" (103).

=== Autobiographical ties ===
Islas' works have many biographical ties. The strong themes of sexuality are related to Islas's own exploration of his sexuality. Many characters also suffer from physical illness, such as Miguel Chico in The Rain God. The novel opens with Miguel recovering from surgery and noting how he will "forever be a slave to plastic appliances" (7). Events like this directly reflect the life of Islas himself, who had many surgeries including a colostomy in 1969. Like Chico, Islas suffered from polio when he was eight and had to undergo long sessions of physical therapy. The illness left him with a permanent limp.

Miguel Chico is also similar to Islas in that "he had been the first in his generation to leave home immediately following high school after being admitted to a private and prestigious university before it was fashionable or expedient to accept students from his background" (5), just as Islas went to Stanford. Also like Chico, Islas lived in San Francisco; he also used his hometown as the template for the town where the Angel family lives in his book. And Islas and his cousins were taught reading by his grandmother, like Mama Chona teaches her grandchildren in the novel.

Big Mamou and her daughter, Emily, two characters in La Mollie and the King of Tears, are based on San Francisco blues musician Margaret Moore and her daughter Kirsten Moore, long time close friends of the author. Arturo Islas was Godfather to Kirsten Moore. The story of Kahoutek was originally related to Arturo by Margaret Moore, who first heard it from "Mike", a bass player and bandmate in Johnny Nitro's blues band, The Door Slammers. Arturo was enchanted with the Kahoutek story and decided to use it as the framework for the book. Johnny Nitro, also a friend of Arturo's, played in SF Bay Area clubs, most notably The Saloon in North Beach.

== Works ==
- The Rain God (winner of the Border Regional Library Association's Southwest Book Award)
- Migrant Souls
- La Mollie and the King of Tears

== See also ==
- List of Mexican American writers
