= Comstock Saloon =

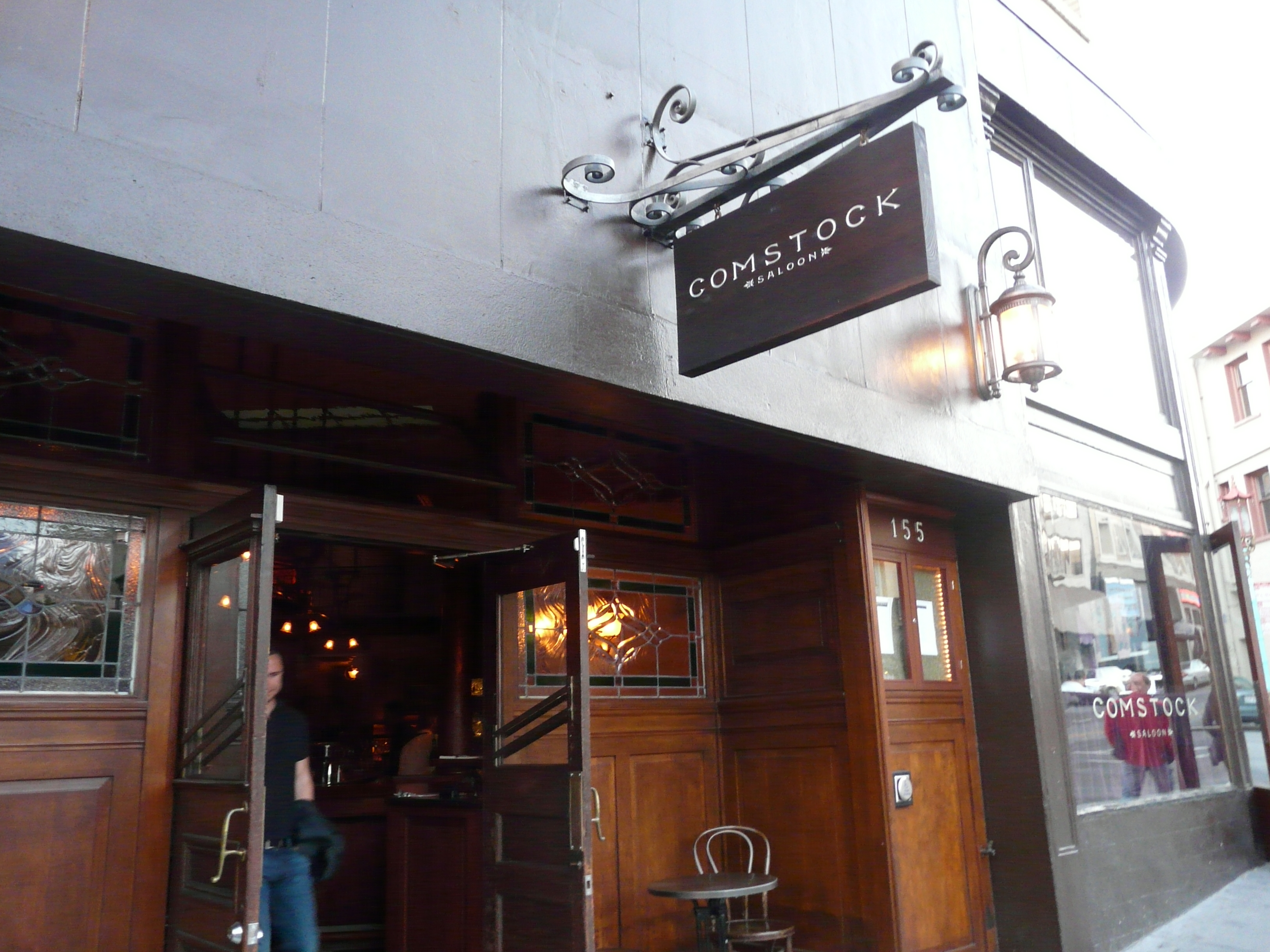
- Interactive map of Comstock Saloon

Restaurant information
- Established: 2009
- Owners: Jeff Hollinger, Jonny Raglin
- Location: 155 Columbus Ave, San Francisco, California, 94133, United States
- Coordinates: 37.79696°N 122.40559°W
- Website: comstocksaloon.com

Comstock Saloon is a historic saloon in San Francisco, California, located in San Francisco's North Beach. The building, since 1907, housed several different bars and owners. The predecessor being the San Francisco Brewing Company (1985–2012), which is the oldest microbrewery in San Francisco. The bar is named after Henry Comstock and for his Comstock Lode, and is currently owned by Jeff Hollinger and Jonny Raglin, both also bartenders for Absinthe Brasserie & Bar. The bar is preserving most of the building's history, including the interior of the building which has been remained unchanged.

== History ==
The building that houses the Comstock Saloon has been around since the late 19th century, being a part of the Barbary Coast. The earliest known owner was Pigeon-Toed Sal of the Billy Goat Saloon. After the San Francisco earthquake in 1906, the building was rebuilt and has stood since then, housing the Andromeda Saloon in 1907, owned by Jim Griffin. During the Prohibition era, it was renamed to the Andromeda Cafe, which sold alcohol under the guise of 'medicinal purposes'. It was one of the few bars in the United States that stayed after the end of the prohibition.

In 1977, restaurateur Sam DuVall acquired the building, renaming it to The Albatross and began renovating the place, buying out the barber shop next door and turning it into the bar's kitchen.

In 1985, Allan Paul acquired the building and established the San Francisco Brewing Company, which was one of the first microbrewery companies in San Francisco.

In 2009, Jeff Hollinger and Jonny Raglin, both owners of the Absinthe Brasserie & Bar, acquired the building to start on the Comstock Saloon project, which Raglin states, "Instead of talking about their drinks and food, we want to try to get people to think about what’s really important in life, like history and life." The Comstock Saloon opened the same year and, since the acquisition, the building was slowly being restored and preserved, saving and keeping the interior as it was unchanged. The Comstock Saloon is under The Absinthe Group, which overlooks Absinthe Brasserie & Bar, Arlequin Wine Merchant, and Spanish-themed bar and restaurant called Bellotta.

The saloon was featured in an episode of Anthony Bourdain: The Layover, where he describes it as "a no-nonsense, old school bar."

On September 15, 2014, a car struck the Comstock Saloon, injuring two patrons, crashing into the side room which was called the 'Monkey Bar', as well as the doors which needed to be rebuilt.

The Comstock Saloon was temporarily closed in March 2020 to 2021 due to the COVID-19 pandemic and stay-at-home orders. After the pandemic, the Comstock Saloon reopened for both walk in patrons and by reservation.

== Interior ==
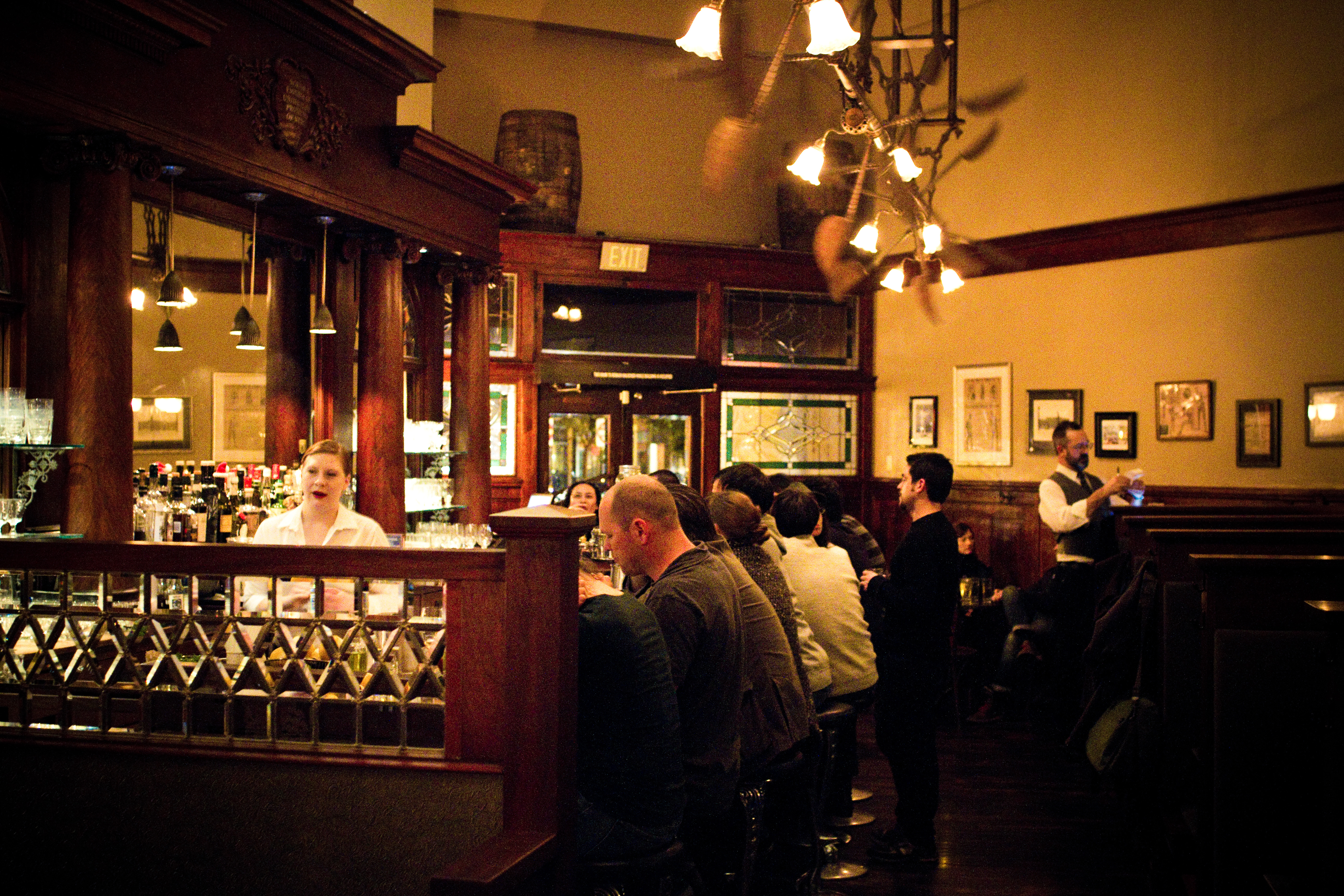
Interior of the Comstock Saloon, showcasing the mahogany bar top and the "punkah" ceiling fans.

The interior of the Comstock Saloon has remained mostly unchanged since its rebuilding in 1906. The 18-feet mahogany bar top dates back to the late 1890s. "Punkah" ceiling fans that hung on the roof dates back to the 1910s, only being installed in the 1970s when it was known as The Albatross.

The building, now under the name Comstock Saloon, also operates as a museum, housing the building's history along with the history of being a bar and saloon. Owner Jeff Hollinger describes the setting of Comstock Saloon as a place that shows the history of drinking in San Francisco. The wooden booths and paraphernalia, which were behind glass cases, also defined the bar's personality as vintage and antique.

== See also ==
- Historic bars and saloons in San Francisco
