= The Rain God =

Novel by Arturo Islas

The Rain God: A Desert Tale
- First edition
- Author: Arturo Islas
- Cover artist: Design by James Stockton & Assoc.
- Language: English
- Genre: Hispanic American literature
- Publisher: Alexandrian
- Publication date: 1984
- Publication place: U.S.A.
- Media type: Hardback
- Pages: 180 pp.
- ISBN: 0-916485-00-5 (Correct for first Printing, 1984 Alexandrian

The Rain God is a novel by Arturo Islas. The story involves a Mexican family living in a town on the U.S.-Mexican border over generations. It illustrates the family's struggles with disabilities, religious orthodoxy, racialized violence, and ethnic identification. The Rain God was awarded the best fiction prize from the Border Regional Library Conference in 1985 and was selected by the Bay Area Reviewers Association as one of the three best novels of 1984.

== Plot overview ==
In the opening chapter, Miguel Chico, son of Miguel Grande and Juanita is introduced. He is a product of a Mexican family from the southwest borderlands, the only member of the Angel family to attain a college education, and lives in San Francisco away from the family. Miguel Chico being educated, in therapy, and possibly gay, is viewed with suspicion by many of the family members, who feel obligated to the family, its various small town circumstances, and religious & cultural beliefs.

Nina, Juanita's sister, and her family become the central focus in the following chapter. After a move to a nicer home, her son Antony becomes interested in the emerging Pachuco culture of youth in the area. This causes Nina and her husband to struggle with how to set boundaries and rules for him. After one of their fights, Antony does not return, and is found drowned in all his clothes on in a local river. It's unclear if the death was a suicide, or if he was murdered, as the specter of anti-Mexican white supremacist practices floats around the various characters in the novel.

As the novels various characters and themes are developed, the religious undertones of sin & sinners becomes apparent, mostly because of the way the family moves around and responds to the matriarch: Mama Chona. Mamma Chona's son, Miguel Chico's father, Miguel Grande, is shown to not only be a machista who hates how his son acts (coming home to find him wearing dresses & playing with dolls given to him by his mother and their maid), but the way his wife makes love. He is a cop and fairly respected in the town. Miguel Grande is also dealing with the grief caused by the murder of his brother Felix. In a major scene when he shows up to pick up Felix, Grande assumes it's just another of his brother's drunken nights, but instead he finds his brother almost unrecognizable and missing a testicle. Neither the cops nor the doctor tell him who murdered Felix, but again, foul play is assumed, as Felix was known to fool around with men, even though he was married to a woman and had children.

It is also eventually revealed Grande is having an affair with Lola, who is his wife Juanita's best friend. The community knew of their infidelity, but Juanita chose to ignore it, because she liked the family & life Miguel Grande had granted her, and them. Grande tries to find absolution through Miguel Chico on a trip to SF, but Miguel Chico does not allow it; even mocking and belittling his father. Grande is thus torn between them, but chooses Lola, who also eventual leaves him by moving to L.A., after they are both confronted by Juanita.

By this point it is apparent that Islas uses the "fragmented third person narrative" to not only play with time: is the past the past; how does it shape the present; how does it design or influence the future, but the ways in which all the family members lives are connected to each other. In terms of literary tradition or references, the tension between Miguel Grande and Chico also mirrors the conflict between John and his father in Got Tell It on the Mountain; while Juanita and Lola's relationship can conjure that of Sula and Nel's from Sula. It is clear to the reader that they are in the hands of a skilled writer, as Islas even begins to bend the realism of the family's history and choices.

Chapter four expands and complicates the life Felix Angel. He is a man who helps migrants find work, loves food, and cares deeply for his family, but also cheats on his wife Angie with young men. His sexuality is an open secret in the community. Even Miguel Grande knows of Felix's desires, but does not expose him to the family, or allow it to taint his love of him, which is possibly why he is so hard on Miguel Chico. There is also a strange sequence in the chapter when Felix and Angies' youngest son, Joel, begins to sleep in the bed with them, because he can't sleep and cries at night. Later in the novel we come to find it is likely the first signs of the boys mental illness that leads to drug addiction. To Angie, Felix and Joel's embrace is almost erotic, and she eventually decides to sleep in the living room. In this chapter readers also get access to who killed Felix. He was known to offer and give rides to migrant workers or soldiers who frequented a gay bar near his job. One day he offers a young soldier a ride and Felix makes sexual advances towards him. Islas depicts the brutal murder with startling clarity and in a way that alludes to the way the land itself is eating the Angel family alive.

In the last chapter, Mama Chona is centralized. She fled the Mexican Revolution, blaming both sides for the death of her son. Throughout the whole novel Islas' portrays her as a woman who is judgmental, racist towards indigenous Mexicans, and privileges Castilian ways. In this section those markers are amplified. She picks and chooses which children and grand children she loves and shows affection for. She feels doing labor in the home is beneath her, and attempts to never expose her skin to the sun for fear of it affecting her fair skin. She is so self involved and absorbed she does not acknowledge how her choices have scared her family, and impacted their circumstances. She was so afraid of her own self/body she dies because she ignores it.

A great deal of social, cultural and historical territory is covered by the book.

== Main characters ==
- Miguel Chico is the son of Miguel Grande and Juanita. He attends a prestigious private school, one of the first people of Mexican origin to do so, and eventually becomes a university professor living in San Francisco. He suffers from chronic ill health, is not married and only visits his family rarely. He has a reasonably good relationship with his mother, but is mostly estranged from his father. Miguel Chico can also be seen as the narrator of the book. There are many analogies between Islas and the character of Miguel Chico. Like Chico, Islas suffered from polio when he was eight and had to undergo long sessions of physical therapy. The illness left him with a permanent limp. In 1969, he underwent a major surgery and got a colostomy. Also like Chico, Islas lived in San Francisco, and used his hometown as the template for the town where the Angel family lives in his book.
- Miguel Grande is Juanita's husband and Mama Chona's youngest child. He was named after his deceased brother. He is described as a big, dominant, hard-working policeman, and family patriarch. Miguel Grande is selfish & inconsiderate. He avoids his relatives as much as possible, except his mother, whom he visits nearly every day. Miguel Grande takes advantage of his wife's naivete by having several affairs, including with Lola, her best friend.
- Felix is the oldest surviving son of Mama Chona and married to Angie, with whom he has four children: Yerma, Magdalena, Roberto and Joel. Magdalena was the only one who suspected foul play with her father's death, and asked Miguel Grande what actually happened. Felix married Angie without the blessing of Mama Chona, who considers her a low-class Mexican. He is also gay, but close to his aunt, Tia Cuca, who is also seen as a sexual sinner, because she lived her life as she pleased, the opposite of her sister.
- Nina is the sister of Juanita. She works as an accountant for various business firms, and is also interested in the supernatural. She has a fractious relationship with her conservative and violent father.

== Critical studies ==
(as of March 2008)

1. Marta E. Sánchez, "Arturo Islas' The Rain God: An Alternative Tradition," American Literature 62.2 (Jun. 1990), pp. 284–304. Stable URL.
2. Rosaura Sáanchez, "Ideological Discourses in Arturo Islas' The Rain God," Criticism in the Borderlands: Studies in Chicano Literature, Culture, and Ideology, Ed. Hectór Calderón and José David Saldívar, Duke UP, pp. 114–126 (accessed via Google Scholar, 6 March 2008).
3. Antonio C. Márquez, "The Historical Imagination in Arturo Islas's The Rain God and Migrant Souls," MELUS 19.2, (Summer 1994), pp. 3–16. Stable URL.
4. Emily Caroline Perkins, "Recovery and Loss: Politics of the Disabled Male Chicano." Disability Studies Quarterly, 2006 Winter; 26 (1): [no pagination].
5. Yolanda Padilla, Indian Mexico: The Changing Face of Indigeneity in Mexican American Literature, 1910–1984 (dissertation)
6. David Rice, "Sinners among Angels, or Family History and the Ethnic Narrator in Arturo Islas's The Rain God and Migrant Souls." Lit: Literature Interpretation Theory, 2000 Aug; 11 (2): 169–97.
7. Wilson Neate, "Repression and the Abject Body: Writing the Family History in Arturo Islas's The Rain God." Revista Canaria de Estudios Ingleses, 1997 Nov; 35: 211–32.
8. Manuel de Jesús Vega, "Chicano, Gay, and Doomed: AIDS in Arturo Islas' The Rain God." Confluencia: Revista Hispanica de Cultura y Literatura, 1996 Spring; 11 (2): 112–18.
9. Paul Skenazy, "Borders and Bridges, Doors and Drugstores: Toward a Geography of Time." IN: Fine and Skenazy, San Francisco in Fiction: Essays in a Regional Literature. Albuquerque: U of New Mexico P; 1995. pp. 198–216
10. José David Saldívar, "The Hybridity of Culture in Arturo Islas's The Rain God." IN: Colatrella and Alkana, Cohension and Dissent in America. Albany: State U of New York P; 1994. pp. 159–73; also in Dispositio: Revista Americana de Estudios Comparados y Culturales/American Journal of Comparative and Cultural S, 1991; 16 (41): 109–19.
11. Lupe Cárdenas, "Growing Up Chicano-Crisis Time in Three Contemporary Chicano Novels (Pocho, Y no se lo tragó la tierra, and The Rain God)." Confluencia: Revista Hispanica de Cultura y Literatura, 1987 Fall; 3 (1): 129–136.
12. Erlinda Gonzales-Berry, "Sensuality, Repression, and Death in Arturo Islas's The Rain God." The Bilingual Review/La Revista Bilingue, 1985 Sept.-Dec.; 12 (3): 258–261.
13. Adrian Xavier Juarez, "Middle Class Worries In Arturo Islas' The Rain God." (dissertation), California State University, Northridge

== See also ==
- Mexican Americans
- Chicano literature
- List of Mexican American writers
