= Johnny Nitro (musician) =

American blues musician

Johnny Nitro (born John Lawrence Newton; September 2, 1951 – February 19, 2011) was a blues vocalist, guitarist, and band leader in the San Francisco Bay Area. He served as a longtime entertainer and community figure in the North Beach district. He regularly played at local venues, such as The Saloon and Lou's Pier 47, with his band, Johnny Nitro & the Doorslammers. He also served as a mentor to musicians, such as Tommy Castro. In his lifetime, Nitro played with a range of blues artists, including Albert Collins, Albert King, and Sunny Rhodes.

== Early history ==
Nitro was born in 1951, and he grew up in Sacramento, California. As a child, he liked to draw illustrations and cartoons. At 13 years old, he bought his first Fender electric guitar at a pawn shop with lunch money that he had saved. He taught himself to play by listening to his friend's B.B. King record. He played lead guitar in some local "basement bands" for several years after purchasing his first guitar. Some of Nitro's early musical influences were Beach Boys, Chuck Berry and British Invasion bands. During this period, blues and folk music were popular in the United States. However, living electric blues musicians were often neglected, as well as practitioners of Chicago Blues. Nitro, however, was drawn to electric blues, and he found inspiration in artists such as Albert Collins, Albert King, T-Bone Walker, and Guitar Slim as a teen.

In the 1972, Nitro moved to San Francisco to attend the San Francisco Art Institute, where he had received an academic scholarship. The cultural and creative energy of SFAI of the 1970s and 1980s left a profound impact on many artists, such as Dara Birnbaum, Bill Jacobson, and Carol Szymanski. The experimental filmmaker, George Kuchar, taught at the school for decades.

At SFAI, Nitro studied filmmaking, painting, and sculpture. He developed a film development technique, in which he would spray footage with raw developer in the sunlight. Then, he would wash the film with a garden hose to leave "...splotches of clear undeveloped film along side big, black dots in different sizes of developed film," according to friend and fellow film student, Jonathan Slon. The size and the shape of splotches varied, depending on how the nozzle was handled. "John got me thinking about how one might manipulate the image down to the chemistry of the emulsion," Slon explained.

After three years at SFAI, Nitro dropped out of college. He decided that he did not want to make a living as a fine artist. Instead, he would pursue music and auto work. Nitro continued to live in the North Beach district of San Francisco, sometimes out of a 1947 panel truck. He supported himself with various jobs, including auto mechanic work and drag race work at venues such as Sears Point. He picked up the name "Nitro" due to his work with automobiles. As he explained in a 2006 interview, "I was the guy who mixed the fuel, so I was Nitro Man."

== Musical career ==
In the 1970s, Nitro began to connect with Bay Area musicians. He played with the Dynatones, a San Francisco-based rhythm and blues band, where many local musicians began their careers. He also played at Big John & Harris’ Town Pump, a former "hillbilly bar" that attracted locals, sailors, and sex workers in the Mission district.

Johnny Ace, a local musician and former bandmate, described his first encounter with Johnny Nitro in 1978:

"It was back then that we all met Johnny Nitro, who, at that time, was known as Johnny Newton. He’d usually come in with his wife, Margaret, who played some pretty tasty boogie woogie piano. He had very long, flaming red hair down his back and always wore old Hawaiian shirts that were popular at that time. He looked like he just rolled out of bed. His appearance was a bit gruff. We affectionately called him 'Red.' He was always in very deep thought and a bit uptight too, like he was getting ready to explode, but always a very nice guy."

In the late 1970s, the Saloon, the oldest running saloon in San Francisco, became a local hub for blues. The owner at the time, Tommy Browne, decided to offer live music shows on weekends. Lisa Kindred, who had previously played music in the Greenwich Village folk and Chicago blues scenes, was a bartender at the Saloon at the time. She began to play blues at the bar with Gino Skaggs. Eventually, Nitro began to play with both of them. They developed an eight-piece blues band, in which both Nitro played the guitar. Ron Thompson also played the guitar On some nights, musicians such as Nick Gravenites, John Cipollina, Charlie Musselwhite, and Roy Rogers played with the band. The shows were very popular, according to Kindred.

In the 1980s, Johnny Nitro received mentorship from Sunny Rhodes, who lived Oakland, and from Cowboy, the bassist for Sunny Rhodes. The city of Oakland held a rich blues music history, with its heyday spanning from the 1930s to 1960s. As Johnny Ace commented, "I know some of that Texas-Oakland grease got into Nitro’s fingers and soul from that experience." Nitro was influenced by other Texas blues musicians, such as Stevie Ray Vaughan and The Fabulous Thunderbirds, as well.

In 1983, Nitro formed his band, Johnny Nitro and the Doorslammers, and the band issued a 45. That year, the band began to play live shows at the Saloon. At first, the band played once per week at the Saloon, but they eventually began to play twice per week. The original bass player, who was drawn to slap-funk bass style, eventually quit the band. In 1987, Johnny Ace joined the band on bass. He explained, "My bass playing made Nitro’s band sound fatter and enabled Nitro to have the freedom and space musically to wail... I kept a very simple, pulsating groove going." Gary James played guitar and a man named Arthur, originally from Los Angeles, played the keyboard. However, Arthur died sometime around 1987.

By 1989, the band line-up changed to include Perry Welsh on harp and vocals ("a young kid just 18 out of Oakland"), Scott Rabino on drums, and Stu Blank on vocals/keyboard. Tommy Castro played guitar for the Doorslammers in the 1980s, as well. During these years, Nitro penned many songs. One of his most famous was "Too Many Dirty Dishes." The song was later played and recorded by Albert Collins (Cold Snap album) and recorded by Tab Benoit. That year, the band recorded music at Bayview Studios in Richmond, California. However, according to Johnny Ace, nothing was done with the tapes.

In the 1980s and 1990s, Johnny Nitro primarily supported himself as a working musician, often playing shows six nights per week. In North Beach, the band played at the Saloon on Friday and Sunday nights, Lost and Found (formerly known as the Coffee Gallery) on weekends, and at Grant & Green Saloon. They also played at JJ's in San Jose, Bouncers in the South of Market district of San Francisco, Larry Blake's in Berkeley, and at private parties. The band occasionally played shows in Sacramento at Hofbrau.

In the 1990s, the band went through another lineup change. Welsh left the band, and a man named Andy, from San Jose, replaced him on harp and vocals. Johnny Ace left the band in 1991 to pursue screenwriting. AJ Kelly (also known as "Cubby") joined as the bass player, and Tony Perez joined as the saxophone player. Perez later sang vocals as well. The song “One More Night," written by Johnny Nitro, was included in the 2004 film Twisted. In the early 1990s, Nitro performed a show with Albert King at Larry Blake's. He also began to teach guitar at the Blue Bear School of Music.

Johnny Nitro developed a strong relationship with the North Beach community, both as a musician and mentor. As J.C. Smith, a Bay Area blues singer and guitarist, recalled: "One time I asked him why he didn't go on tour. He said, 'That way people have to come see me in North Beach.' He was the king of North Beach." For local musicians, such as Tommy Castro, Nitro served as a mentor. As Castro wrote: "The thing he liked to do the most was help musicians who had a burning desire to play to an audience. If a person had the right intention, and respect for his stage and maybe a little talent, he would allow them to come up and play with him and his band. He did this thousands of times... He helped me the same way when I showed up in North Beach in the late ‘80s."

The band released a series of albums, including Car Fixin' Blues (Saloon Recordings, 1993), Drinkin' Triples 'Till You're Seeing Double (Saloon Recordings, 1991), and Trouble (2003). His band included various members over the years, including Kathy Tejcka. The Doorslammers played at various events, such as the Delta Blues Festival in Antioch, California. As he grew older, blues music became less popular in the United States. However, the band continued to play shows regularly at the Saloon and other venues.

== Personal life ==
Johnny Nitro (John Newton) grew up in Sacramento, California in the Curtis Park area with his mom and dad (Barbara and Warren Newton). He was the oldest of four children with a brother (Ric) and two younger sisters (Margaret and Anne). Johnny was always a "free spirit" as described by his dad. Throughout his youth, his dad often took him to the local Stock Car races which influenced Johnny's passion for drag racing and his hobby of collecting and building model car kits.

He was a talented artist and musician during his high school years. He spent many hours drawing, painting or playing his guitar. On weekends, he frequently performed at parties and local events as the lead guitarist in two different "Cover Tune" bands. The first band he joined was called "The Renegades". He later formed his own band called "Albatross". He graduated in 1969 from C.K. McClatchy High School. He continued his education taking some art and film making courses at Sacramento City College but soon after moved to the bay area to attend the San Francisco Art Institute.

As an adult, Nitro was interested in metaphysics. He sometimes attended lectures and received psychic healings at the Psychic Institute in Berkeley.

In the 1970s/80s, his partner was Margaret Moore, who played keyboard in his band. They had one daughter, Kirsten Moore. The couple were friends with Arturo Islas, who became the godfather to Kirsten. After Moore, Nitro dated a woman named Tracy, who owned a bookstore on Polk Street. In 1993, he married Silvia Cicardini, and the couple bought a house together in Antioch, California. Cicardini sang and played tenor saxophone in the Doorslammers. He later separated with Cicardini. Although Cicardini left the band, she would sometimes still make appearances. After their separation, Nitro moved into his apartment above the Saloon, which he had kept for many years.

== Death ==
For many years, Johnny Nitro suffered with health issues. Although he quit drinking and smoking, he suffered from diabetes and heart disease. In 1998, Nitro had open-heart surgery, and years later, he had another surgery. In December 2010, he collapsed onstage in the middle of a performance. Although he was hospitalized, he was back on stage by the next weekend.

On February 19, 2011, Johnny Nitro died in his apartment above the Saloon. He was 59 years old. Paramedics brought down Nitro's body in a white sheet, and a crowd from the Saloon applauded in commemoration. The San Francisco Chronicle wrote, "Johnny Nitro's life ended like one of his gigs: in an old North Beach bar, on a Saturday night, surrounded by fans." Following his death, memorial shows were scheduled in Redwood City and San Francisco. In November 2019, Kim Addonizio read a poem, "Blues Guitar," at McEvoy Foundation for the Arts. The poem was a tribute to Nitro and included backing vocals from musicians of the Saloon.

== Discography ==
- Tom Castro, Johnny Nitro, Kevin Russell – S.F. Blues Guitar Summit Vol. III (1993)
- Car Fixin' Blues (Saloon Recordings, 1993)
- Drinkin' Triples 'Till You're Seeing Double (Saloon Recordings, 1991)
- Trouble (2003)
