= Barbary Coast Trail =

Marked trail in San Francisco, US

Coordinates: 37°47′58″N 122°24′32″W

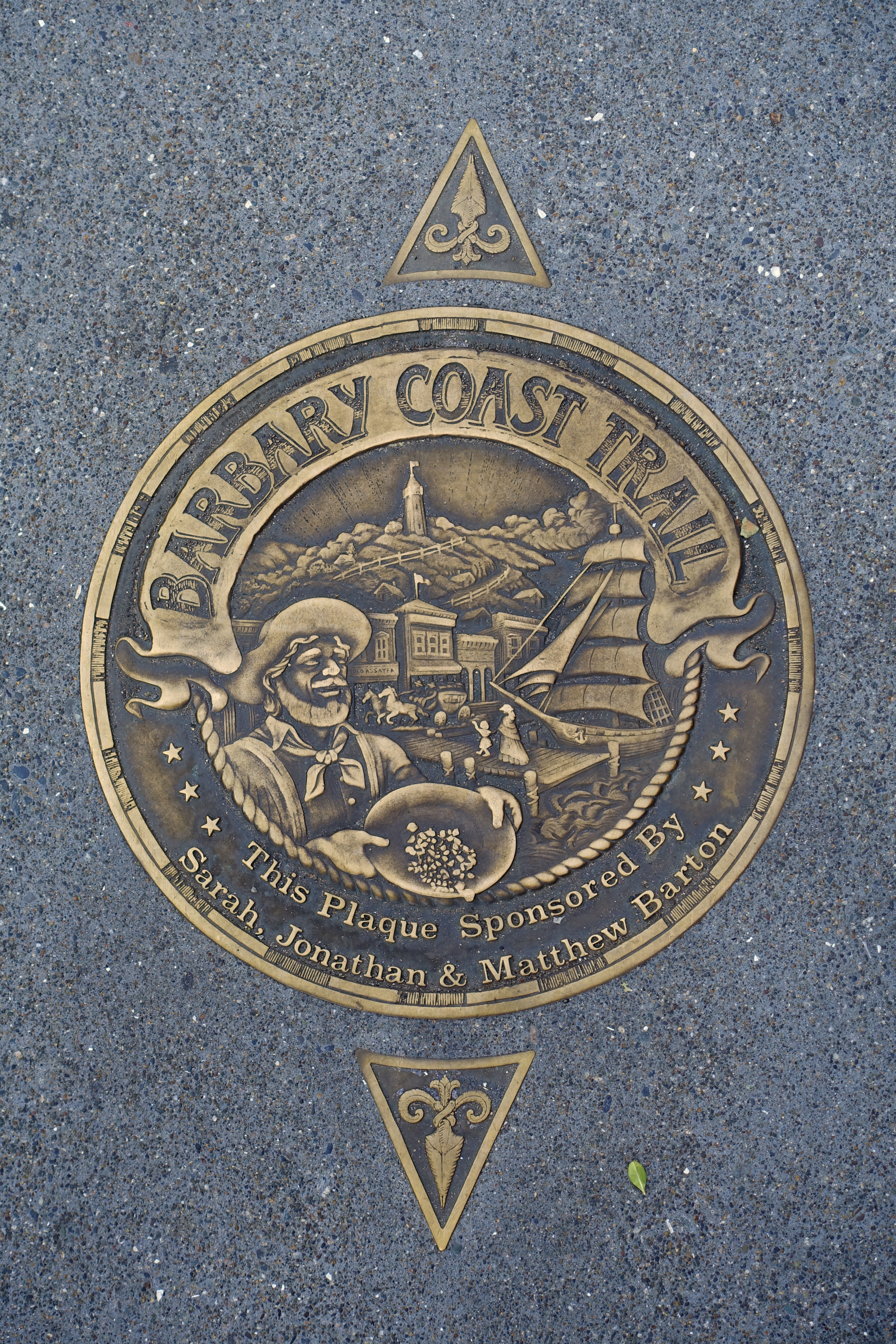
- Special markers implanted in the sidewalk trace the path of the trail
- Length: 3.8 mi (6.1 km)
- Location: San Francisco, California
- Established: 2000
- Trailheads: Old Mint to Fisherman's Wharf
- Use: Walking, History
- Difficulty: Easy
- Sights: 20 historical sites
- Surface: Concrete
- Website: barbarycoasttrail.org

The Barbary Coast Trail is a marked trail that connects a series of historic sites and several local history museums in San Francisco, California. Approximately 180 bronze medallions and arrows embedded in the sidewalk mark the 3.8-mile (6.1 km) trail.

The historic sites of the Barbary Coast Trail relate primarily to the period from the California Gold Rush of 1849 to the Earthquake and Fire of 1906, a period when San Francisco grew from a small village to an important shipping port.

Sites along the trail include the Old Mint, a national historic landmark; Union Square; Maiden Lane; Old St. Mary's Cathedral, first Catholic cathedral West of the Rockies; T'ien Hou temple, one of the oldest still-operating Chinese temples in the United States; Wells Fargo History Museum; Pony Express headquarters site; Jackson Square Historic District, which contains the last cluster of Gold Rush and Barbary Coast-era buildings in San Francisco; The Old Ship Saloon, once a shanghaiing den; Coit Tower; Fisherman's Wharf; SF Maritime National Historical Park, which maintains a large collection of historic ships; and Ghirardelli Square.

Each end of the Barbary Coast Trail is connected by the Hyde-Powell cable car line, itself a national historic landmark.

== History ==
The Barbary Coast Trail was founded by historian Daniel Bacon in collaboration with the San Francisco Historical Society. The trail was inaugurated in May 1998 and was originally marked with painted images as trail markers. The images were replaced over time with bronze medallions designed by Daniel Bacon and illustrator Jim Blair. By the year 2015, approximately 180 medallions had been placed in total.

== Major trail sites ==
Major Trail Sites are listed in their order of appearance on the trail when starting at the southern end

1. San Francisco Mint
2. Market Street
3. Union Square
4. Maiden Lane
5. The Dragon Gate
6. Waverly Place
7. Tin How Temple
8. Chinese Telephone Exchange
9. Wells Fargo History Museum
10. Belli Building
11. Hotaling Building
12. Bella Union
13. Vesuvio Cafe
14. City Lights Bookstore
15. Washington Square
16. Coit Tower
17. Fisherman's Wharf
18. Hyde Street Pier
19. Buena Vista Cafe
20. San Francisco cable car system

== See also ==
- Barbary Coast, San Francisco
- 49-Mile Scenic Drive
- Chinatown
- Hallidie Plaza
- International Settlement (San Francisco)
- Nob Hill
- Portsmouth Square
- The Embarcadero
