= Peninsula Mile Houses =

Historic stagecoach line in San Francisco Bay Area

Peninsula Mile Houses began to be opened, in 1849, with the organization of a stagecoach line service connecting San Francisco and San Jose, California, U.S.. They served as stagecoach stop locations for transfer, rest, and refreshment, for travelers and horses, on the rough journey that spanned at least nine hours from San Francisco to San Jose.

== History ==
The Mile House naming convention noted how far they were from important destinations or departure points. This was a tradition for inns and outlying public houses in Great Britain, and across the United States. These roadhouses were established as places to get water for horses and alcoholic drinks for people.

In the 1850s Gold Rush California, the Sierra Nevada foothills had a network of Mile Houses referring to the distance to Sacramento, at 4,5,10,12,14,16,18,26, and 40 miles.

The need for a stagecoach line between San Francisco and San Jose was spurred by rapid growth in the San Francisco Bay Area during the California Gold Rush. Peninsula mile houses were built along the routes and occasionally named for its location, but mostly named according to how many miles they sat from Portsmouth Square, the San Francisco Ferry Building, or Mission San Francisco de Asís. Many of these simple rest stops for travelers and their horses evolved into thriving businesses, including hotels, restaurants, and saloons.

In 1859 the San Bruno Toll Road, later named the San Mateo Road, built by county seat Redwood City businessmen, was completed, merging with El Camino Real at what is today San Mateo Avenue in San Bruno.

In 1875, Richard Sneath began building a dairy, later controlling 3000 acres. By 1900, his business extended to three ranches, run by 75 men. Sneath merged his operation with John Daly and others, creating the Dairy Development Company, later absorbed by the Borden Company.

By 1888, water was piped from Crystal Springs Dam for Spring Valley Water Works near the San Bruno Toll Road to San Francisco.

In 1889, Jenevein's Junction House, was built at the corner of San Mateo Avenue (San Bruno Toll Road) and El Camino Real (''Old Mission Road), where the two roads met.

In 1906, after the earthquake and fire in San Francisco, some refugees fled south along the San Bruno Toll Road and El Camino Real (Old Mission Road), to where the two roads met, and a homeless refugee camp was set up to provide shelter.

== List of Peninsula Mile Houses ==
1 Mile House, was located at Mission and 5th Streets, San Francisco, 1 mile from Portsmouth Square

1 Mile House, or Abbey House, on the original mile house route, the El Camino Real route, was located near Daly City, California.

3 Mile House was located on the second mile house route, the San Bruno Toll Road route, near what is now the Interstate 280 (California)/Bayshore Freeway.

4 Mile House was located on the second mile house route, the San Bruno Toll Road route, about a mile north of the 5 Mile House.

5 Mile House is located in San Francisco at 3600 San Bruno Avenue (Between Girard Street and Wilde Avenue), on the second mile house route, the San Bruno Toll Road route, but no longer has any ground-floor business operating. In its heyday, it was a prominent stop because it was the last Mile House in San Francisco city limits, and because it was at the end of the Third Street rail line, which was built in 1894.

6 Mile House on today's Bayshore Boulevard, Sunnydale Avenue and Visitacion Avenue, on the second mile house route, the San Bruno Toll Road route, was the first Mile House outside of the San Francisco City limits.

7 Mile House the first, was built in 1853 on Old Mission Road, on the original mile house route, the El Camino Real route, and located near Daly City, California.

7 Mile House was built in 1876 in Brisbane, California on the second mile house route, the San Bruno Toll Road route, at the 1858 toll gate, and is the only active mile house in its original location. Egidio Micheli bought 7 Mile House in 1903 and sold to his brother-in-law, Palmiro Testa in 1910. Camille Stuehler bought 7 Mile House in 1953 and sold to Vanessa Garcia in 2004. On 6 August 1876, 7 Mile House was a hub for members of the Hayes Valley Gang. During the Prohibition in the United States, in the 1920s, 7 Mile House was a speakeasy and had prostitution. In the 1980s, it was raided by the FBI, as part of Ron "the Cigar" Saccos horse racing and sports betting operation. 7 Mile House is now a live music venue, and dog-friendly restaurant serving American, Italian, and Filipino food.

12 Mile House was located in South San Francisco, California.

San Bruno House was built in 1861 or 1862 by Richard Cunningham, at San Bruno Avenue and San Mateo Avenue, in what is now San Bruno, but it was not named a "mile house".

August Jenevein's Junction House, was built, in 1889, at the corner of San Mateo Avenue (San Bruno Toll Road) and El Camino Real (Old Mission Road), in what is now San Bruno, where the two roads met.

14 Mile House (nicknamed Uncle Tom's Cabin) was built in 1849 at El Camino Real and Crystal Springs Creek in San Bruno, California. The creek it was located by marked one of the most hazardous legs of the trip

16 Mile House was built in Millbrae, California in 1872, at Center Street and El Camino Real, by the heirs of the Rancho Buri Buri grantee, Jose Sanchez, and remained active in its original location until 1971 when it was demolished. In 1972, new 16 Mile House opened as a steakhouse at 448 Broadway.

17 Mile House (Millbrae Hotel, built by Perry Jones) at El Camino Real and Millbrae Avenue, in Millbrae. was first known to exist in 1844, became the first stop for Millbrae on the San Francisco and San Jose Railroad in 1863, and burned down in 1907.

Halfway House was a stage stop, in San Mateo, roughly equidistant between San Francisco and San Jose.

== See also ==
- 21-Mile House
- Historic bars and saloons in San Francisco
