= The Old Ship Saloon =

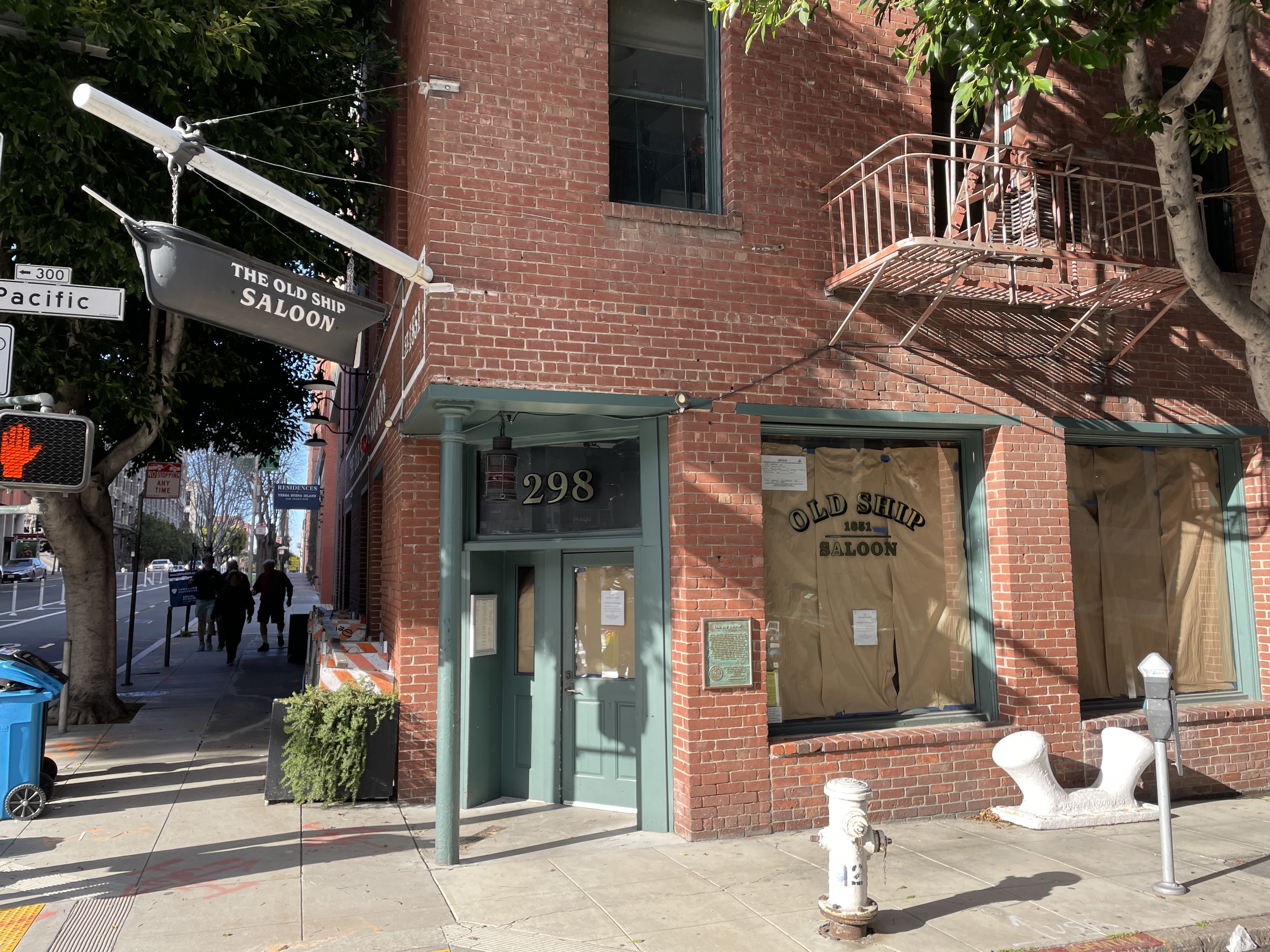

- Location within San Francisco County Old Ship Saloon (California) Old Ship Saloon (the United States)

General information
- Location: 298 Pacific Ave; San Francisco, California
- Coordinates: 37.7984°N 122.4007°W,
- Management: Bill Duffy

The Old Ship Saloon, formerly the Old Ship Alehouse, is a historic bar dating back to 1851 and the California gold rush when it operated out of the side of a ship run aground until the wreckage was buried and the current structure was built on top of it. It is located at 298 Pacific Avenue in the Jackson Square neighborhood of San Francisco. The Old Ship Saloon is listed as a stop along the Barbary Coast Trail.

== History ==
=== The Arkansas ===
In 1847, San Francisco was a small settlement home to approximately 800 residents. New residents flocked to the city during the California gold rush of 1849, increasing the population to approximately 25,000 by 1850. Many immigrants arrived by ship, including one named Arkansas. Arkansas was built in New York City in 1833. She was a wooden, three-masted schooner displacing 267 tons. She was purchased in February, 1849 for $21,000 by the California Mutual Benefit and Joint Stock Association, a company established to finance a voyage carrying fortune seekers to San Francisco. Arkansas left New York on 26 June 1849 and sailed to San Francisco via Cape Horn, a popular route between the east and west coasts of the United States prior to the construction of the Panama Canal. Prior to her arrival in San Francisco, Arkansas made port in Rio de Janeiro, Brazil and Talcahuano, Chile. Arkansas arrived in San Francisco Bay after a nearly 6-month journey on 20 December 1849 where she ran aground on the rocks surrounding Alcatraz Island.

=== The Old Ship Alehouse ===
The steamship Senator was hired for $2,000 to tow Arkansas to the tidal flats in Yerba Buena Cove where she was left along the Pacific Street Wharf at what would later become the northeast corner of Pacific Avenue and Battery Street. Being no longer seaworthy due to damage, Arkansas' masts were cut off and she was converted to a storeship. An entrepreneur named Joe Anthony opened a saloon inside Arkansas called "The Old Ship Alehouse" and cut a hole in the bow to act as the door which customers accessed using a gang plank leading up from the wharf. A sign above the door reportedly read, "Gude, Bad, an Indif'rent Spirits Sold Here! At 25¢ each". The first bartender was 19 year old James "Jimmy" Laflin who had worked aboard the Arkansas as a cabin boy on her final voyage. Laflin would later become one of San Francisco's most prolific shanghaiers, continuing to use the Old Ship as a venue to kidnap patrons and press them into service on seafaring ships.

As the city expanded, Yerba Buena Cove was gradually filled in and downtown San Francisco built on top of the fill. The Arkansas, like many ships, was left in place at what would later become the northeast corner of Pacific Avenue and Battery Street. By 1855, the cove had been filled in to Front St, one city block east of the Arkansas, leaving the ship partially buried. In 1859, the upper parts of the ship were dismantled and a hotel was built on top of the deck and hull similar to that built on top of the Niantic nearby. The bar was renamed from 'the Old Ship Alehouse' to 'The Old Ship Saloon' and continued operating in the ground floor of the new building.

=== Deconstruction of the Arkansas ===
At some point after the construction of the hotel, Arkansas was apparently silted-in but not completely buried and at least somewhat exposed to the tides. The ship itself was sold to Charles Hare for $1,000. Hare was a prominent local businessman that ran a large ship breaking operation. Shipbreaking was an active industry in San Francisco at the time as there were many ships that were abandoned in Yerba Buena cove upon arrival when their crews and captains traveled inland to mine for gold. Hare did not purchase the building along with the ship and as a result, he and his crew had to dismantle Arkansas without disturbing the hotel above. A local newspaper, The Daily Alta California, reported that one night the ship was mistakenly allowed to break free from the silt and float, crashing into the hotel from below. The ship had to be scuttled again for work to continue, however Hare's crew reportedly left a large portion of the ship buried in place.

=== Changes in ownership ===
The hotel and bar were purchased in the early 1890s by Warren P. Herman, and again in 1897 by Henry Klee, both of whom continued using the saloon to shanghai unsuspecting patrons. Henry Klee maintained ownership of the Old Ship through the 1906 earthquake and fire in which the building was severely damaged. Klee rebuilt the building in 1907 as it appears today, and is identified by the original painted sign still visible on the east side of the building reading, "Old Ship Saloon, Henry Klee Prop.". The Old Ship changed hands again in 1937, after which it was renamed "Monte Carlo Cafe" and served as a cafe and brothel during World War II. The bar changed hands and was renamed again until being acquired in 1992 by the current owner, Bill Duffy, who restored the name as "The Old Ship Saloon" and continues to operate the bar today.

=== Rediscovery of the Arkansas ===
Some remains of Arkansas remain buried under The Old Ship Saloon to the present day. In 2016, a construction crew working on the foundation of a residential building in the next lot unearthed what appeared to be Arkansas' remains 25 feet underground. The largest intact piece was a 15 foot long section of her false keel. The construction company reported the find to local authorities. After examining the remains a team of archaeologists agreed they would be too difficult to remove. The remains of the Arkansas were left in place and re-buried.

== See also ==
- Historic bars and saloons in San Francisco
