= The Saloon =

Oldest saloon in San Francisco

Coordinates: 37.79857°N 122.40708°W

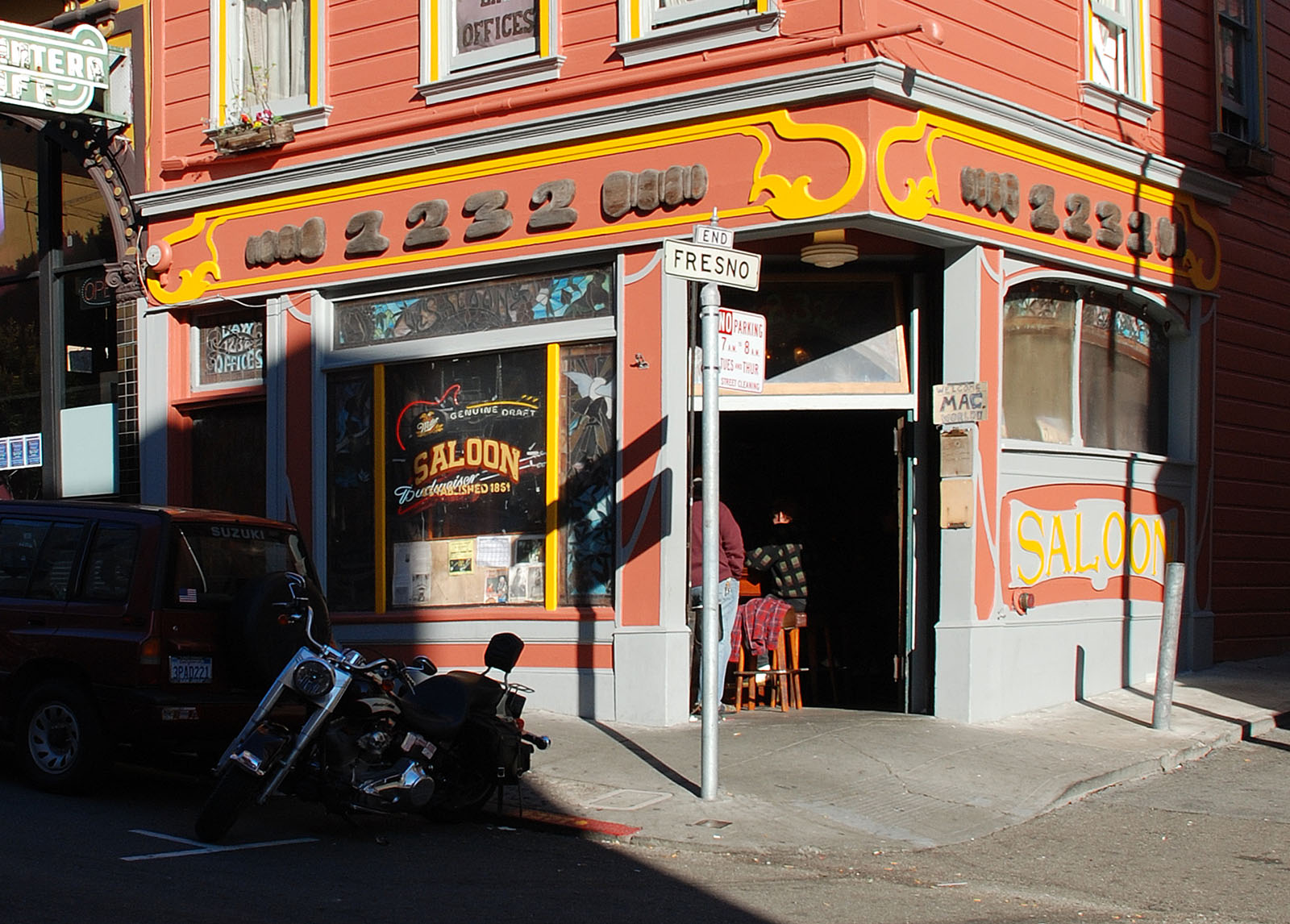
The Saloon's Exterior

The Saloon, located at 1232 Grant Avenue in North Beach, is one of the oldest operational taverns in San Francisco.

== History ==
The Saloon first opened in 1861, and was originally owned by Ferdinand E. Wagner. Wagner was the son of a liquor merchant from Stundwiller Bas-Rhin, France. In 1836 Wagner migrated to Louisiana, married a native of Cannes nine years later, to eventually open a saloon there. By 1852 Wagner had relocated to San Francisco, to first work as a hotel manager and then as a fruit vendor. His family later rejoined him in San Francisco, and by 1868 he opened Wagner's Beer Hall at 308 Dupont Street. When Dupont Street was renamed as Grant Avenue, the tavern's address changed to 1232 Grant Ave. Wagner and his family though lived in the two floors above the bar, and one of his sons would continue to operate the business after he retired. Wagner's Beer Hall was eventually renamed as simply the Saloon.

The Saloon's wooden bar, was constructed outside of the US, shipped to San Francisco and installed in 1860. Located in the North Beach neighborhood of San Francisco, the Saloon continues to maintain a sense of similarity with its original 1870s aesthetic.

== Notable performers ==
Several talented and famous musicians have performed at the venue. The following is a partial list of who either got their start or had performances at The Saloon:

- Paul Butterfield
- Tommy Castro
- John Cipollina
- James Cotton
- Janis Joplin
- Steve Miller
- Charlie Musselwhite
- Johnny Nitro
- Boz Scaggs

== Appearances in other media ==
The Saloon later featured in a 1975 episode of The Streets of San Francisco called "Poisoned Snow". Actors from the show such as Michael Douglas, Karl Malden and Anthony Geary filmed scenes inside the bar. The Saloon is also seen in Star Trek IV: The Voyage Home.

== See also ==
- 1906 San Francisco earthquake
- Historic bars and saloons in San Francisco
- Barbary Coast
- Gold Rush of 1849
- Jackson Square
- North Beach
- Telegraph Hill
- Blues
