= Tommy Castro =

American guitarist (born 1955)

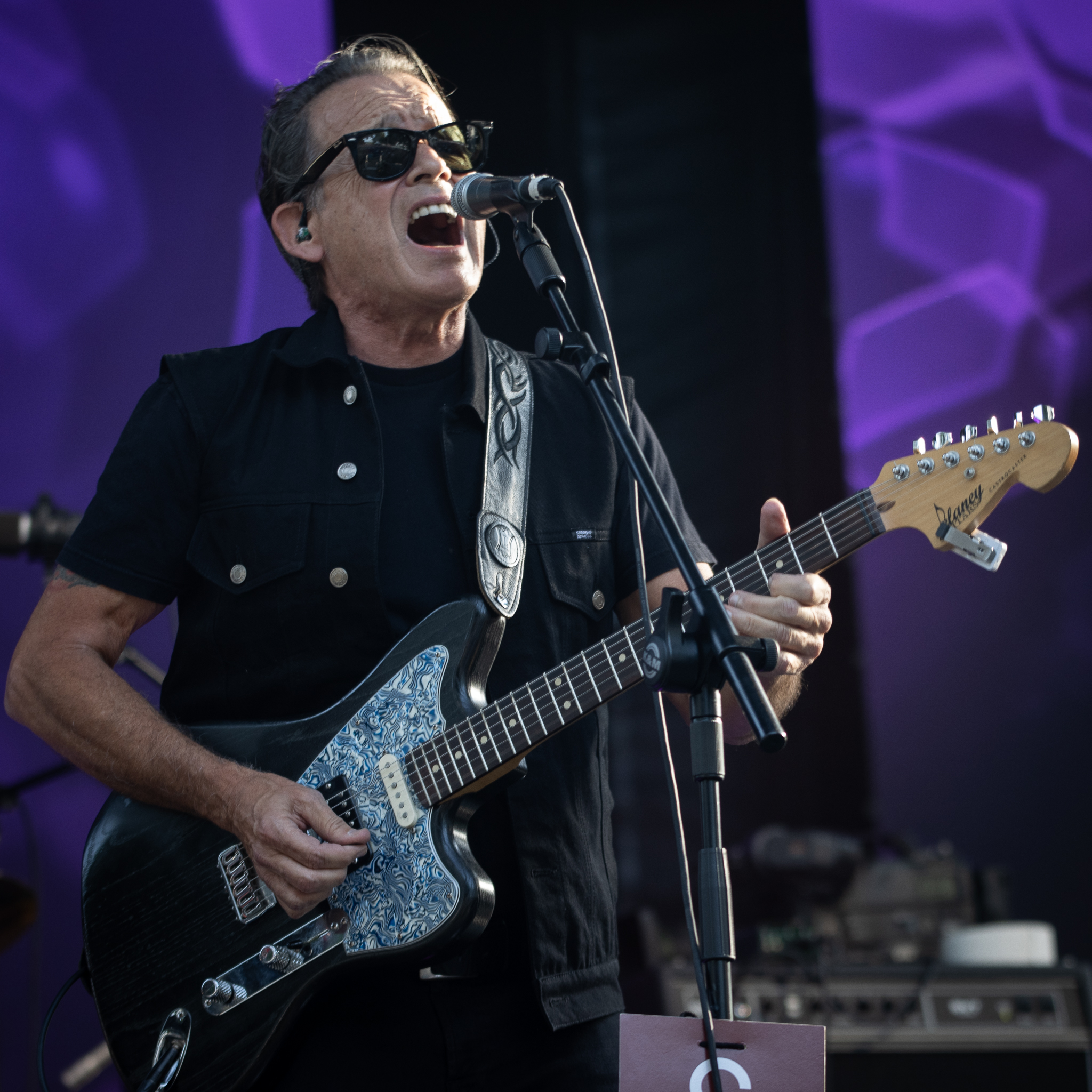
- Tommy Castro Live at W.C. Handy Blues Festival 2021

Background information
- Born: April 15, 1955 (age 71); San Jose, California, U.S.
- Genres: Blues, soul, Southern rock, Chicago blues, rock and roll, soul-blues
- Occupations: Musician, songwriter
- Instruments: Guitar, vocals
- Years active: 1980s–present
- Labels: Alligator, Blind Pig, Telarc, 33rd Street, Delta Groove, Heart And Soul, Saloon
- Website: tommycastro.com

Tommy Castro (born April 15, 1955) is an American blues, R&B, and rock guitarist and singer. He has been recording since the mid-1990s. His music has taken him from local stages to national and international touring. His popularity was marked by his winning the 2008 Blues Music Award for Entertainer of the Year.

According to The Chicago Sun-Times, Castro plays "Memphis soul-drenched R&B…top-of-the-line blues." Tom Callahan of Blurt added, "Castro has a soulful voice, searing guitar and is an excellent songwriter and vocalist. If you close your eyes you will be convinced that you are listening to Otis Redding singing in 1967…tremendous."

== Biography ==
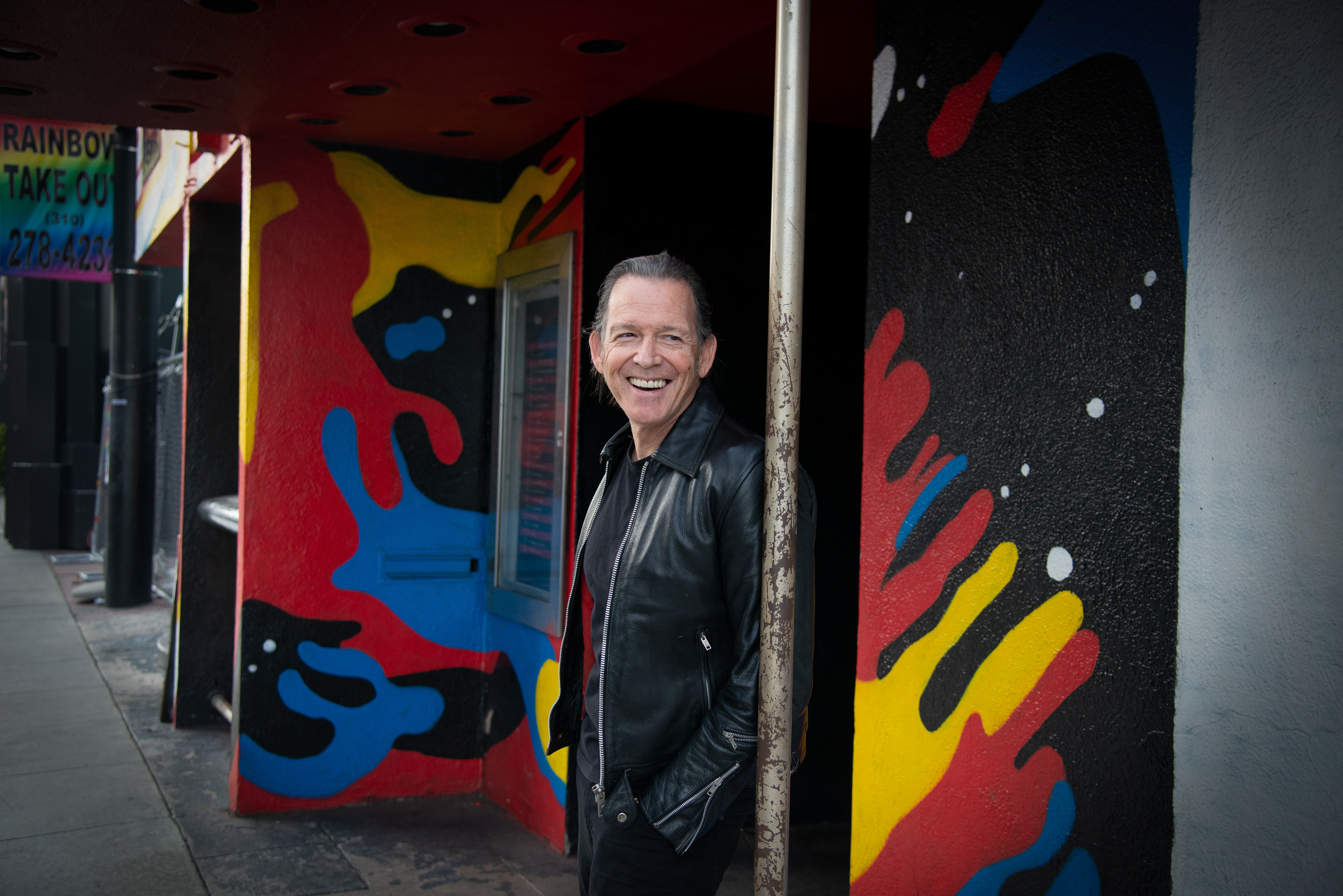
Tommy Castro, Los Angeles, 2021

Castro was born and raised in San Jose, California. Castro began playing guitar at the age of 10 and was influenced and inspired by electric blues, Chicago blues, West Coast blues, soul music, 1960s rock and roll and Southern rock. His style has always been a hybrid of all his favorite genres. He names Mike Bloomfield, Elvin Bishop, Eric Clapton, B. B. King, Buddy Guy, Elmore James and Freddie King as guitar influences and Ray Charles, Wilson Pickett and James Brown as vocal influences.

He began playing professionally in Bay Area cover-song bands in the 1970s. In the 1980s he joined the Warner Bros. Records' band The Dynatones. In San Francisco, he began playing with North Beach musicians in the 1980s. He cited Johnny Nitro and Johnny Ace as early mentors at that stage in his life.

Since 1991, he has led his own bands, featuring a drummer, a bass guitar player, and a saxophone player (Keith Crossan has held the saxophone position for many years). As of 2009, he had added trumpeter Tom Poole and keyboards to the band. He was signed to Blind Pig Records label and released Exception to the Rule in late 1996. It won the 1997 Bay Area Music Award for Outstanding Blues Album, and Castro also took the award for Outstanding Blues Musician that same year. Castro was also an early adopter of the internet's new graphical web browsers to promote his music. He established his web presence in September 1995, and registered his first domain name in December 1996. In the mid-1990s The Tommy Castro Band served as the house band for three seasons on NBC Television's Comedy Showcase (airing right after Saturday Night Live), bringing him in front of millions of viewers every week.

In 2001 and 2002, B. B. King asked Castro to open his summer concert tours. Castro received an open invitation to join King on stage for the nightly finale.

Castro has released albums on the Telarc, 33rd Street and Heart And Soul and most recently on the Alligator label, as well as on Blind Pig. His album Guilty of Love featured the last recording session for John Lee Hooker. In 2002 he was featured on the Bo Diddley tribute album Hey Bo Diddley – A Tribute!, performing the song "I Can Tell". In 2007 the readers of BluesWax (online magazine) voted Painkiller as BluesWax album of the year. It also won the 2008 Blues Music Award for Contemporary Blues Album of the Year.

In 2009, Castro joined the roster of Chicago's Alligator Records with his release Hard Believer, produced by John Porter. The album was described by Billboard as "irresistibly funky…it has a street-level grit and a soulful sincerity that's impossible to ignore." Blues Revue said Hard Believer is "a fine set of roadhouse-rockin' blues.". Blurt says, "Hard Believer might just be the best yet from this veteran Bay Area blues artist."

In May 2010, The Blues Foundation awarded Castro multiple Blues Music Award honors for Blues Male Artist of the Year, Contemporary Blues Album of the Year, B. B. King Entertainer of the Year, and with his band, Band of the Year.

In 2011, Castro stripped down his band to a four-piece unit called the Painkillers with bassist Randy McDonald from the original Tommy Castro Band, keyboardist James Pace and original Painkillers drummer Byron Cage. 2013's The Devil You Know, was recorded with this line-up plus guest appearances by Marcia Ball, Tab Benoit, Joe Bonamassa, The Holmes Brothers, and Magic Dick. The album was reviewed by Allmusic.com, saying "Castro brings fiery garage energy to everything. His guitar playing is fired up and roaring with a renewed sharpness that keeps the pot boiling. His voice is a soulful and versatile blue-collar growl. This album is full of the blues, but it's also like a full-charged blue-eyed R&B and soul review, making this one of Castro's finest releases."

In 2015, recording with long-standing bassist Randy McDonald, keyboard player Mike Emerson (Elvin Bishop, Carlene Carter, James Armstrong, Petty Theft), and drummer Bowen Brown he released, Method To My Madness, which debuted at number four in the Billboard Blues Albums Chart.

On September 29, 2017, he released Stompin' Ground (Alligator) again with Painkillers' bassist Randy McDonald, keyboardist Mike Emerson and drummer Bowen Brown. As on his previous albums, Castro had several guests including Charlie Musselwhite (harp and vocals on "Live Every Day"), Mike Zito (guitar and vocals on "Rock Bottom"), Danielle Nicole (vocals on "Soul Shake"), and Los Lobos' David Hidalgo (guitar and vocals on "Them Changes").

In 2023, Castro was given his second consecutive Blues Music Award as 'B. B. King Entertainer of the Year'. He followed that in 2025 with another Blues Music Award as 'Blues Rock Artist of the Year'.

After the release of the album Closer to the Bone album in 2025, Tommy Castro and the Painkillers launched the "Closer to the Bone" Tour with performances throughout Europe and North America. The tour lasted into 2026.

== Discography ==
- 1993: S.F. Blues Guitar Summit, Vol. III with Johnny Nitro and Kevin Russell (Blues Bureau International/Shrapnel)
- 1994: No Foolin' [live] (Saloon)
- 1995: Exception to the Rule (Blind Pig)
- 1997: Can't Keep a Good Man Down (Blind Pig)
- 1999: Right as Rain (Blind Pig)
- 2000: Live at the Fillmore (Blind Pig)
- 2001: The Essential Tommy Castro (Blind Pig) compilation
- 2001: Guilty of Love (33rd Street)
- 2001: Mystic Theater Live (promotional 4-song EP) (33rd Street)
- 2003: Gratitude (Heart & Soul; now on Oarfin)
- 2003: Triple Trouble with Jimmy Hall and Lloyd Jones (Telarc)
- 2005: Soul Shaker (Blind Pig)
- 2007: Painkiller (Blind Pig)
- 2008: Command Performance: The Legendary Rhythm & Blues Revue (Delta Groove)
- 2009: Hard Believer (Alligator)
- 2011: Tommy Castro Presents 'The Legendary Rhythm & Blues Revue – Live!' (Alligator)
- 2012: "Greedy" / "That's All I Got" (7" single) (Alligator)
- 2014: The Devil You Know (Alligator)
- 2015: Method to My Madness (Alligator)
- 2017: Stompin' Ground (Alligator)
- 2019: Killin' it Live (Alligator)
- 2021: Tommy Castro Presents 'A Bluesman Came to Town (A Blues Odyssey)' (Alligator)
- 2025: Closer to the Bone (Alligator)
