= Red Light Abatement Act =

California legislation

California State Legislature
- Introduced: 3 November 1914; 110 years ago
- Signed into law: April 7, 1913
- Governor: Hiram Johnson

Status: Current legislation

The Red Light Abatement Act is a vice law in California that was intended to curtail or eliminate prostitution. The Act was passed by the California legislature and signed by Governor Hiram Johnson in 1913, and became effective on 3 November 1914. Under the Act, brothels around the state were eventually shut down. The legislation was modelled on the liquor laws that had originated in Iowa.

The law was opposed by some California residents who gathered signatures for a veto referendum, 53% of voters voted yes and the new act became law.

The Act stated "every building or place used for the purpose of prostitution, and every building or place in or upon which acts of prostitution, are held or occur, is a nuisance which should be enjoined, abated, and prevented, and for which damages may be recovered." By 1920, 33 states has passed similar legislation.

Under the act owners of the buildings where prostitution takes place are fined by the city. This led many property owners to be more vigilant of the activity which took place in their buildings, as well as to institute discriminatory renting practices, such as not allowing single women to rent a first floor apartment. In some places, women could not rent an apartment at all. As a result, prostitution moved to the streets, making the practice more dangerous.

After many years, most red light districts ceased to exist under this act.

The legislation was still in use in 2018, when it was used to shut down San Jose massage parlors run by Hung Nguyen.
