= Barbary Coast, San Francisco =

Red-light district in San Francisco (1849-1917)

Coordinates: 37.79656°N 122.40593°W

The shipping docks of Buena Vista Cove at the east end of Pacific Street during the 1860s (San Francisco History Center, San Francisco Public Library)

The Barbary Coast was a red-light district during the second half of the 19th and early 20th centuries in San Francisco that featured dance halls, concert saloons, bars, jazz clubs, variety shows, and brothels. Its nine block area was centered on a three block stretch of Pacific Street, now Pacific Avenue, between Montgomery and Stockton Streets. Pacific Street was the first street to cut through the hills of San Francisco, starting near Portsmouth Square and continuing east to the first shipping docks at Buena Vista Cove.

The Barbary Coast was born during the California gold rush, when the population of San Francisco was growing at an exponential rate due to the rapid influx of tens of thousands of miners trying to find gold. The early decades of the Barbary Coast were marred by persistent lawlessness, gambling, administrative graft, vigilante justice, and prostitution; however with the passage of time, the city's government gained strength and competence, and the Barbary Coast's maturing entertainment scene of dance halls and jazz clubs influenced American culture. The Barbary Coast's century-long evolution passed through many substantial incarnations due to the city's rapid cultural development during the transition to the 20th century. Its former location now is overlapped by Chinatown, North Beach, and Jackson Square.

== Gold Rush and a first decade ==
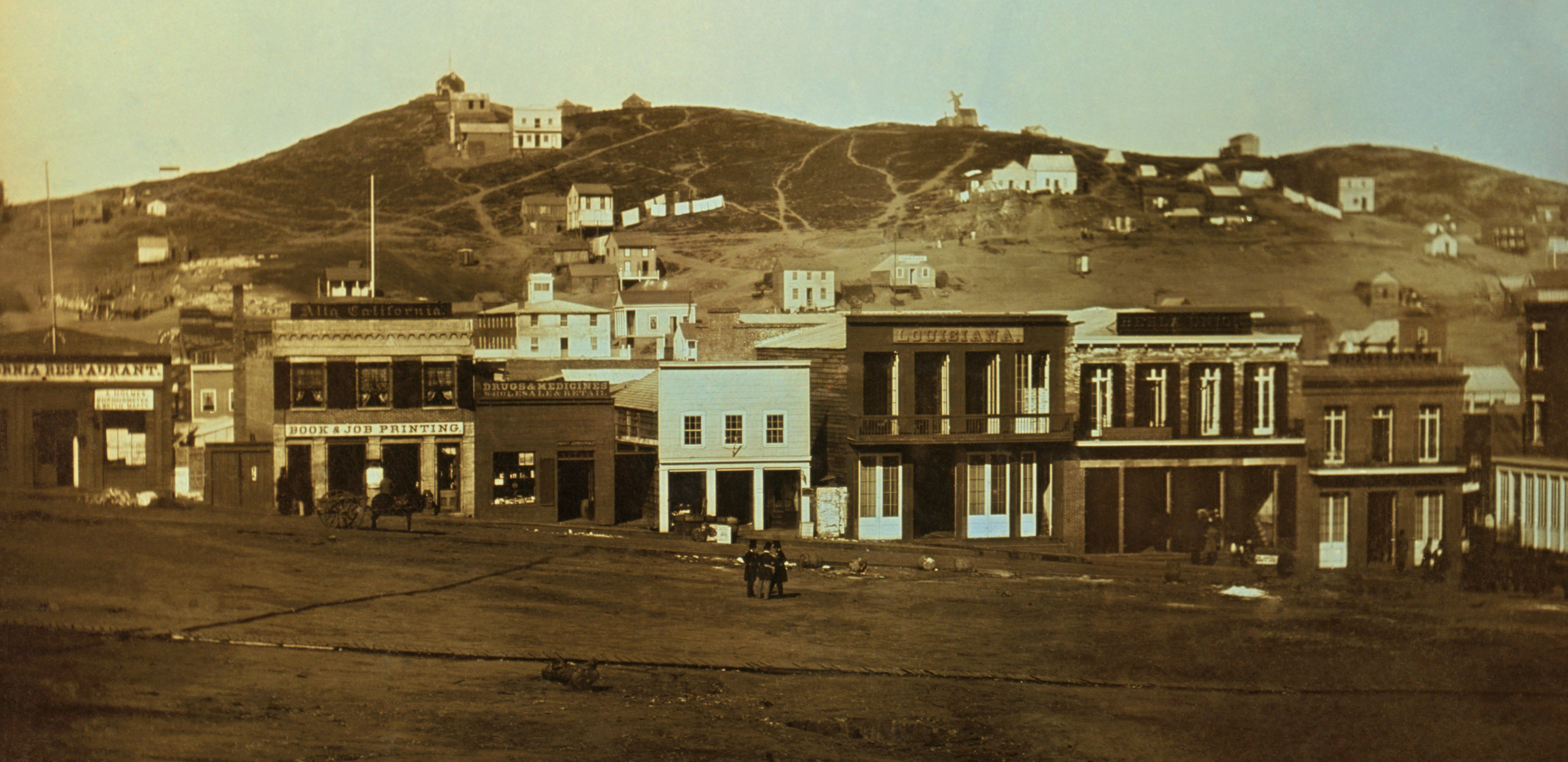
Portsmouth Square, looking north to Telegraph Hill, 1851

San Francisco's Barbary Coast arose from the massive infusion of treasure hunters, called 49-ers, seeking their fortunes by panning for gold as they searched for a potential gold mine.

=== California gold rush ===
Before the California gold rush, there were only a few hundred people living in tents and wooden shanties within San Francisco. However, after the gold rush, the population of San Francisco increased fifty-fold in just two years from 492 in 1847 to over 25,000 in 1849. This extreme growth combined with a lack of strong government created many opportunities for criminals, corrupt politicians, and brothel owners. For many decades murderers and robbers could commit their crimes without punishment, sometimes boldly in public view. As a result, the Barbary Coast became a wild area representative of the Old West, and had many problems with political corruption, gambling, crime, and violence.

Around 1848, a group of volunteers from the Mexican–American War were discharged and settled in San Francisco. Many of them were from New York City gangs from the Five Points and Bowery districts. About 60 of them organized into a gang named The Hounds, and they paraded around as if they were military, and even created a headquarters named Tammany Hall within a tent on Kearny Street. In 1849, these thugs began to call themselves the Regulators as they harassed Mexicans and those of Spanish origin as well as extorted money from local businesses for protection services. Anyone who did not pay was likely to lose a nose, ear, or suffer greater bodily injury. However, after a group of 230 men organized into a militia and confronted the Hounds with possible arrest, they quickly fled from San Francisco.

=== Sydney Town ===
The Hounds was not the only group of criminals to set up business on San Francisco's Barbary Coast. By the end of 1849, several ships from Australia brought former members of Great Britain's penal colony – including ex-convicts, ticket-of-leave men, and criminals – to San Francisco, where they became known as the Sydney Ducks. These Australian immigrants had become so numerous that they dominated the neighborhood. They opened boarding houses and various types of groggeries that had prostitutes affiliated with their businesses. People who entered these groggeries and brothels frequently were beaten and robbed.

A newspaper of the day, the San Francisco Herald, states of Sydney Town:

The upper part of Pacific Street, after dark, is crowded by thieves, gamblers, low women, drunken sailors, and similar characters... Unsuspecting sailors and miners are entrapped by the dexterous thieves and swindlers that are always on the lookout, into these dens, where they are filled with liquor – drugged if necessary, until insensibility coming upon them, they fall an easy victim to their tempters...When the habitues of this quarter have a reason to believe a man has money, they will follow him for days, and employ every device to get him into their clutches...These dance-groggeries are outrageous nuisances and nurseries of crime.

When looting San Francisco's neighborhoods, the Sydney Ducks even set fire to San Francisco six times between 1849 and 1851 in order to distract citizens from their pillaging and murdering. Whenever they planned to start a fire, they waited for south westerly winds so that Sydney Town would not also catch fire. The citizens of San Francisco became enraged, and in 1851, they formed a first Vigilance Committee. Two of the Sydney Ducks, Samuel Whittaker and Robert McKenzie, were then arrested for arson, robbery, and burglary. The vigilantes then held a quick trial, and later hanged them. Vigilantes, unauthorized individuals who use trials and lynchings to punish criminals, were not uncommon in the Old West, but San Francisco's Vigilance Committees were the largest and most organized of America's history. The hangings scared the remaining Sydney Ducks into fleeing the city. Within two weeks after the hangings, Sydney Town had but only a few dance halls, saloons, and brothels remaining. That relative peace only lasted for two years; then criminals returned to the Barbary Coast.

=== More vigilante justice ===
In the latter half of the 19th century, San Francisco saw administrative graft, boss politics, and a persistent lawlessness. For a while after the hangings of Whittaker and McKenzie, San Francisco functioned as a law-abiding city. The hangings frightened corrupt judges and government officials, who then began to do their duties with a rare diligence, not seen so far in San Francisco. This new competency in government did not last long, and by 1852, corrupt government officials developed a system of high salaries and expensive projects with political kickbacks that drained the city's treasury to near bankruptcy. This financial crisis at city hall created a great strain on commerce and affected individual businesses.

The looting of the city's treasury could not have happened without the help of David Broderick, the most powerful man in San Francisco, who was a state senator and held tight control over San Francisco from 1851 until his death in 1859. Broderick's corruption was such that no man could be elected to public office unless he made a deal with Broderick to share half the profits from his office. As a result of these backroom deals, Broderick accumulated a large amount of wealth that strengthened his position as a powerful city boss. As news of the treasury's financial crisis became known, another even larger uprising of enraged citizenry occurred.

James King, a popular journalist and publisher, vehemently protested the administrative graft of Broderick, which angered one of Broderick's main supporters, a supervisor named James Casey. While King was standing in front of his newspaper's building, Casey shot King in the chest, causing a mortal wound that ultimately launched the formation of a second Vigilance Committee in May 1856. Within two hours after Casey's shooting of King, a mob of 10,000 people surrounded the jail where Casey was being held. The vigilantes then demanded that the jail release James Casey into their custody, and the badly outnumbered jail guards acquiesced to their demands. King died six days after being shot, and subsequently Casey was put on trial by the Vigilance Committee. King's funeral attracted over 15,000 people, but by the time the funeral had ended, Casey had been convicted and hanged by the vigilantes. Now energized by wide public support, the Vigilance Committee set up shop in a large building near the wharf that included jail cells, court rooms, a surrounding wall to resist any military intervention; it was nicknamed Fort Gunnybags. During the two months that followed the hanging of Casey, there was not a single murder in San Francisco and less than a half dozen robberies. In August 1856, the Vigilance Committee decided to disband and give control back to the elected officials.

== District defined ==
It was not until the 1860s when sailors gave the district its name, and began to refer to it as the Barbary Coast. The term Barbary Coast is borrowed from the Barbary Coast of North Africa where local pirates and slave traders launched raids on nearby coastal towns and vessels. That African region was notorious for the same kind of predatory dive bars that targeted sailors, as had been done on San Francisco's Barbary Coast. Miners, sailors, and sojourners hungry for female companionship and bawdy entertainment continued to stream into San Francisco in the 1850s and 1860s, becoming the Barbary Coast's primary clientele. During its early days, San Francisco had become a "wide" open city where police had little to no control in stopping the activities of gambling, drinking, drugs, and prostitution. The fact that San Francisco functioned as a port city meant that it was able to sustain large transient populations that were less likely to conform to social rules and regulations.

The Barbary Coast is the haunt of the low and the vile of every kind. The petty thief, the house burglar, the tramp, the whoremonger, lewd women, cutthroats, murderers, all are found here. Dance-halls and concert-saloons, where blear-eyed men and faded women drink vile liquor, smoke offensive tobacco, engage in vulgar conduct, sing obscene songs and say and do everything to heap upon themselves more degradation, are numerous. Low gambling houses, thronged with riot-loving rowdies, in all stages of intoxication, are there. Opium dens, where heathen Chinese and God-forsaken men and women are sprawled in miscellaneous confusion, disgustingly drowsy or completely overcome, are there. Licentiousness, debauchery, pollution, loathsome disease, insanity from dissipation, misery, poverty, wealth, profanity, blasphemy, and death, are there. And Hell, yawning to receive the putrid mass, is there also.

— Asbury, in Benjamin Estelle Lloyd's Lights and Shades of San Francisco (1876)

=== Before the 1906 earthquake ===
During this time, San Francisco went through much commercial growth and became an important shipping port, but matured to a level that forbade any more uprisings by vigilantes. Without the threat of vigilante justice, corruption and crime begin to return along with predatory dives similar to those of Sydney Town. The Barbary Coast continued to build on its notorious reputation as a lawless city. With only 100 policemen as of 1871, San Francisco had a severe shortage of law enforcement at that time. Police Chief Crowley said in his annual report that there was only one officer for every 1,445 inhabitants while New York City had one in 464 and London had one for every 303 residents.

Entertaining the miners, entrepreneurs, and sailors was a huge business and resulted in varied, inventive, and occasionally bizarre forms of entertainment. Except for a couple of restaurants, that three block stretch of Pacific Street was almost wall to wall with drinking establishments. They included dance halls, concert saloons that had entertainment and dancing, melodeons, cheap groggeries, and deadfalls that were beer and wine dens. Initially the melodeons had mechanical reed organs that played music; however they quickly transformed into a kind of cabaret that had theatrical entertainment but no dance floor. The only women allowed in the melodeons were the waitresses and performers. Their shows usually contained songs, bawdy skits, and often featured can-can dancers. The deadfalls were the lowest of the establishments and had hard benches, damp sawdust on the floors, the bar was rough boards laid atop of barrels, had no entertainment, and their wine was often raw alcohol with an added coloring.

The Coast, as it was called, also invented its own kind of dance hall, called a Barbary Coast Dance Hall. It was different than most dance halls in that the only women there were the female employees who were paid to dance with the customers, and received commissions on the drinks that they could encourage their male customers to buy. Lawlessness was so bad in the Barbary Coast district that police did not patrol alone, but chose to walk their beats in pairs and sometimes in groups. There was usually a murder every night and scores of robberies. And even while inside drinking establishments, a customer's property and life were never safe. Prostitution was so common on the Barbary Coast that it was referred to as the Paris of America. Drug addicts of the district could even buy cocaine or morphine at an all-night Grant Street drugstore for only two or three times the price of a beer. During the 1890s, San Francisco hit its peak alcohol consumption in having over 3,000 licensed bars and another 2,000 unlicensed bars.

The waitresses were a major attraction for the saloons and were nicknamed the "pretty waiter girls", but they were not always attractive or young. They were scantily clothed in gaudy outfits while they sold drinks and danced with customers for money. The saloons hired women to exploit the men, instructed to pick customers' pockets, and then give half that money back to the management. The pretty waiter girls earned about $20 per week plus a commission on any drinks and dances that they sold. Small grog houses and deadfalls hired only handful of pretty waiter girls, but the larger dance halls and concert saloons employed up to 50 women. However, some of the concert saloons, like the Eureka and Bella Union, made an effort to have notable Barbary Coast performers appear in their shows and had attractive women for their pretty waiter girls.

It was not unusual for the pretty waiter girls to put drugs into the customers' drinks, so they could later be more easily robbed and sometimes clubbed unconscious. Sailors, who were frequently the targets of the pretty waiter girls, had cause to dread the area because the art of shanghaiing was perfected here. Many a sailor woke up after a night's leave to find himself unexpectedly on another ship bound for some faraway port. The verb to "shanghai" was first coined on the Barbary Coast.

=== After the 1906 earthquake ===
Most of the buildings on that stretch of Pacific Street were destroyed by the earthquake and fire of 1906. However the city's financial boosters then saw an opportunity to clean the tone of the Barbary Coast, and transform it into an entertainment area that would be acceptable for every-day San Franciscans. Possessing a new sense of civic pride, the boosters invested heavily in reconstruction, and within three months, over a dozen dance halls and a dozen bars were rebuilt and operating. This new incarnation of Pacific Street was gentrified and tame compared to the lawless pre-earthquake version of the Barbary Coast. However, prostitution persisted in the district, and it was not until 1917 that Mayor James Rolph made a declaration that he would close every brothel in San Francisco. Same-sex prostitution and entertainment that featured female impersonators briefly existed in a bar on the Barbary Coast as early as the spring of 1908 when The Dash opened on Pacific Street. The Dash employed some female impersonators, and patrons could purchase homosexual sex in its booths. The Dash closed near the end of that same year.

The thriving district also got a new nickname: Terrific Street. The term Terrific Street first was used by musicians in describing the quality of music at the Pacific Street clubs, and the first jazz clubs of San Francisco did occur on Terrific Street and attracted national talents like Sophie Tucker, Sid LeProtti, and Jelly Roll Morton. It was at this time that the Barbary Coast gained a wider appeal and its large dance halls drew tremendous crowds.

The principal attraction of Terrific Street was dancing and many nationally known dance steps like the Texas Tommy and the Turkey Trot, were invented on Terrific Street. At night, its brightly lit block could be seen from across the bay in Oakland despite the fact that neon lights had not yet been invented.

=== Demise ===
An extreme shift in political policy came about in 1911 when James "Sunny Jim" Rolph was elected as mayor for the first of ten terms. Rolph, along with a new group of city supervisors and the business sector, was committed to reforming the Barbary Coast district. Just before election time in September 1913, William Randolph Hearst's newspaper, the Examiner, started a major crusade against the Barbary Coast and in a full-page editorial suggested that it "should be wiped out."

Ten days later, the police commission adopted resolutions that no dancing was allowed in any establishment of the district that served alcohol, that no women – employees or patrons – were permitted in any saloon of the district, and that even electric signs were forbidden. As a result, some drinking establishments fired their female employees and became straight saloons, and others closed their businesses. Some of the larger dance halls moved to other districts and managed to survive for several more years by masquerading as dance academies or closed dance halls, but they never regained their previous popularity. In 1917 the brothels were closed due to the Red Light Abatement Act, but by that time all the excitement of Terrific Street had vanished. Following the Red Light Abatement Act, prostitution zones and prostitutes were forced to outskirt areas such as the Tenderloin and Union Square as shopping centers took over.

== Later eras of the Pacific Street District ==
=== International Settlement ===
International Settlement, 1940s, Pacific Avenue from Montgomery Street towards Kearney Street (San Francisco History Center, San Francisco Public Library)

When Prohibition was adopted in 1920 and stopped the flow of alcohol to the bars, Terrific Street's block lost much excitement, and its dance halls and concert saloons were replaced by offices, hotels, and warehouses. However, after Prohibition was repealed in 1933 and liquor was again available, an attempt was made to revive its entertainment scene. The police commission quashed these efforts when, on February 27, 1934, it announced that no dance permits for the area would be issued. This action followed "the withdrawal by the California state board of equalization of state liquor permits for the district." Protests by women's groups and church organizations influenced these decisions. Still later during World War II, in an attempt to revitalize the district, it was renamed International Settlement, and a pair of large promotional arched overhead signs, that read "International Settlement" were constructed on either end of that Pacific Street block. In the same way that the post-Barbary Coast establishments of Terrific Street attempted to draw customers and tourists with a reference to the Coast's nefarious past before the earthquake, International Settlement also tried to draw tourists with a reference to that lost era.

=== The Broadway scene ===
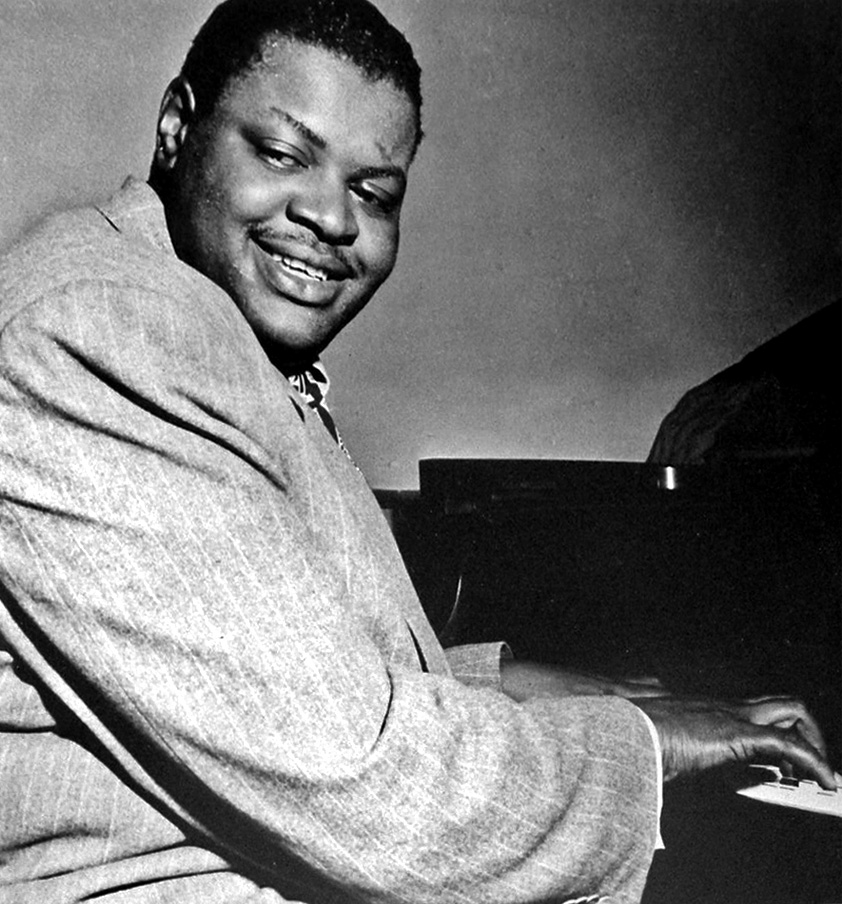
Jazz pianist, composer, and vocalist Oscar Peterson

During the latter half of the 20th century, the entertainment scene and dancing spread one block north to Broadway, which is parallel to Pacific Street. Jazz clubs were everywhere on Broadway during the 1950s and 1960s. Some of Broadway's more famous clubs of that era included Basin Street West, Ann's nightclub, Mr. D's, El Matador, Sugar Hill, Keystone Korner, the hungry i, and the Jazz Workshop.

Mr. D's club, so named because Sammy Davis Jr. was a partial owner, presented performances by Tony Bennett and James Brown. At Ann's nightclub legendary shock comedian Lenny Bruce received his start in standup comedy and created a sensation which drew the attention of journalist Herb Caen and Beat poets like Lawrence Ferlinghetti. Basin Street West started out as a jazz club but later hosted Otis Redding, Ike and Tina Turner, and Lenny Bruce. The hungry i club was a premier showcase of new talent and presented early performances of comedians Phyllis Diller and Woody Allen as well as vocalist Barbra Streisand when she was 19 years old. The El Matador club became popular by booking pricey acts like Oscar Peterson, and its audience occasionally included celebrities such as Clint Eastwood, Frank Sinatra, and Marilyn Monroe. The Jazz Workshop became the premier club to hear jazz during the 1950s and 1960s when musicians like Miles Davis, Cannonball Adderley, and John Coltrane performed there. Comedian Lenny Bruce made headlines and opened a national discussion on the First Amendment's freedom of speech rights when he was arrested at the Jazz Workshop for using profanity in his comedy act. When strip clubs started to arrive on Broadway, some local jazz musicians working in the strip clubs sat in and performed after hours at the jazz clubs. LGBT entertainments of female impersonators also appeared in North Beach at a nightclub named Finocchio's, which opened in 1929. The bar was opened by Joseph Finocchio and was on Stockton Street.

International Settlement's club acts, with their can-can dancers and old-fashioned chorus girls, were unable to compete with the incredible talent and excitement of the emerging Broadway scene, and by the early 1960s their popularity had fallen below a critical level. But despite the brilliance and innovation of Broadway's entertainment scene of the 1950s and 1960s, its live entertainment clubs also lost their popularity with time. As of the first decade in the 21st century, Broadway had lost its standup comedy clubs and its live music clubs, replaced by cocktail lounges with recorded music. However, some live music clubs still operate in other areas of North Beach.

== See also ==
- Belle Cora (Arabella Ryan)
- Frank Gardiner
- Gold Rush of 1849
- Historic bars and saloons in San Francisco
- International Settlement
- Jackson Square
- Montgomery Block
- North Beach
- Port of San Francisco
- 1906 earthquake
- Robert William Service
- Sailortown (dockland)
- Sydney Walton Square

== Bibliography ==
- Asbury, Herbert: The Barbary Coast – An Informal History of the San Francisco Underworld, Thunder's Mouth Press, 1933
- Boyd, Nan Alamilla: Creating a Place For Ourselves: Lesbian, Gay, and Bisexual Community Histories, Routledge, 1997
- Cressey, Paul G.: The Taxi-Dance Hall – A Sociological Study in Commercialized Recreation and City Life, University Chicago Press, 1932
- Federal Writers of WPA: San Francisco in the 1930s – The WPA Guide to the city by the Bay, University California Press, 2011
- Feinstein, Sascha: Keystone Korner – Portrait of a Jazz Club, Indiana University Press, 2012
- Lukas, Gary Paul:Seven Years in Sodom, Xulon Press, 2010
- Montanarelli & Harrison: Strange But True San Francisco – Tales of the city by the Bay, PRC Publishing, 2005
- Pryor, Alton: California's Hidden Gold – Nuggets from the State's Rich History, Stagecoach Publishing, 2002
- Richards, Rand: Historic Walks in San Francisco, Heritage House Publishers, 2008
