= Mama's (restaurant) =

Restaurant in San Francisco's North Beach

Coordinates: 37°48′5.7″N 122°24′34.7″W

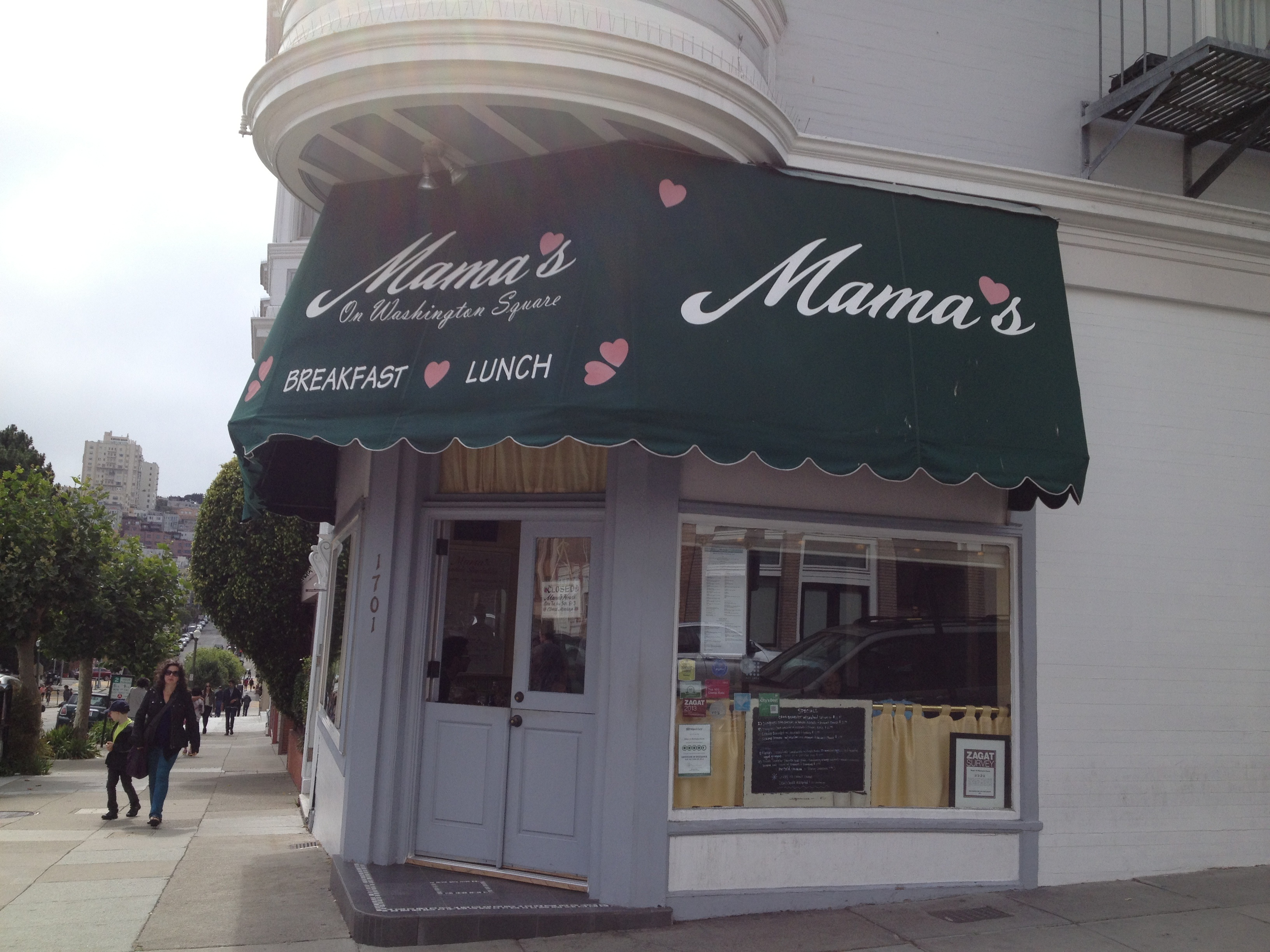
- Interactive map of Mama's

Restaurant information
- Location: San Francisco, California, United States
- Website: mamas-sf.com

Mama's on Washington Square is a family-owned restaurant located in San Francisco's North Beach neighborhood. The restaurant sits on the corner of Stockton Street and Filbert Street, across from Washington Square Park. Founded in 1964, Mama's serves breakfast, brunch, and lunch as well as its own baked goods and gift baskets. The restaurant specializes in omelettes, salads, and sandwiches, and sells homemade jam, fresh baked bread, and pastries.

== History ==
=== Herbert Sherbet Shop: 1951–1964 ===
In 1946, Michael Joseph Sanchez Sr. and Frances Muriel Lent married in San Francisco. By 1951, the couple had four children and decided to lease a small business location at 1701 Stockton Street in North Beach. There, they opened an ice cream and confectionery shop called Herbert's Sherbet. Frances helped run the ice cream and candy shop, while Michael sold life insurance policies for Occidental Life from a back office. Earlier, as a young man, Michael had had a small produce company with two of his brothers. They imported limes from Mexico, their native country, before immigrating with their family to San Francisco in 1927. The Sanchezes became a vital part of the tight-knit North Beach community among its mostly native Italian shopkeepers, bakers, coffee roasters, and bar and restaurant owners of the early 20th century.

=== Mama's on Washington Square: 1960s ===
Thirteen years later, the Sanchezes decided to try their hand at the restaurant business. They took the wall down between the back office and the ice cream store, and in 1964, the location was remodeled into a cozy, 14-table restaurant that Michael named the "Mama's on Washington Square.” He used a heart instead of an apostrophe to honor Frances, who by then was "Mama" to their eight children. The fresh inspiration of Mama's unique American cuisine-style breakfast menu, fresh seafood, vegetable, and fruit salads, and Italian baguette sandwiches attracted long lines that grew outside the restaurant as Mama and Papa cooked side-by-side with Italian native, Mary Balzarini, and a loyal staff who served the crowds.

In 1970, "Papa" gave the restaurant to "Mama" as a personal gift. He went on to create "Mama's of San Francisco," a corporation formed to expand the Mama's brand under Macy's of California in its flagship store at Union Square. It was an instant success. Long lines of customers snaked throughout Macy's Cellar in 1972 to eat at the expanded Mama's at Macy's Cellar. Sanchez opened eight Mama's locations in total, with several in the South Bay Area at Macy's Stores, as well as a flagship location in the Gramercy Towers on Nob Hill, and another on the corner of Geary and Mason Street, all of which Sanchez closed by 1997.

=== 1970s–1990s ===
In 1971, San Francisco food critic Jack Shelton wrote: "the reason for Mama's appeal is Mama herself". She had become a beloved San Francisco personality, whom the public knew affectionately as the "Mama" who took care of her customers as if they were extended family. For solo diners, "Mama" would find an empty chair at any table, make introductions between customers, and set a warm family-style atmosphere of goodwill. When she was not cooking on the line, she could be found serving meals or refilling coffee cups, delighted to mingle among her customers. Frances "Mama" Sanchez was truly everyone's "Mama" to her staff, and as her children, their school friends, and extended family all worked on weekends and on summer break as they were growing up.

Mama's on Washington Square imbued the diversity of the colorful neighborhood of writers, poets, politicians, and travelers, attracting celebrities from Los Angeles and New York not only as a top eatery, but also as a prime location for film and television. The quaint, authentic charm of Mama's Victorian architecture, combined with the tall spires of Saints Peter and Paul Church and Washington Square Park, can be seen in films including Bullitt, Dirty Harry, What's Up, Doc?, Pete 'n' Tillie, and episodes of the series The Streets of San Francisco, starring Michael Douglas and Karl Malden.

Throughout the 70s and 80s "Mama" was a popular caterer of exclusive events in San Francisco and the Napa Valley, and she enjoyed occasional appearances cooking on regionally broadcast television programs in the Bay Area. Herb Caen, a daily columnist for the San Francisco Chronicle, mentioned "Mama" often for her charitable work and appearances. She was featured for her culinary expertise in Sunset, Gourmet, and San Francisco magazines. Among her many admirers in the food industry were world-renowned chefs Julia Child and James Beard. As a renowned San Francisco public figure, Frances "Mama" Sanchez was an honored recipient of San Francisco's prestigious Key to the City award under Mayor Dianne Feinstein. Sanchez was recognized for her tireless and charitable commitment to the San Francisco chapter of Meals on Wheels, and for her love of the arts. She sat on the boards of the American Conservatory Theater, the San Francisco Opera, the San Francisco Ballet, and the San Francisco Symphony.

=== 1990s–present ===
By the mid-90s Frances' health deteriorated, and the couple retired from the day-to-day restaurant business that by then was in the care of their children. Eldest son Michael Sanchez Jr. and wife Debra Sanchez began operating the original Mama's on Washington Square around 1996.

Frances "Mama" Sanchez died on August 13, 2000, in Marin County at the age of 72. The San Francisco Board of Supervisors adjourned their scheduled monthly meeting of August 21, 2000, in her honor. In a letter to her family from Mayor Willie Brown, Sanchez was heralded for her kindness and forty years of professional contributions. That year, Frances "Mama" Sanchez was immortalized by friends, family, and admirers as a part of the "Step into History" project, where five tiles bearing her name were engraved on the east side steps of Pioneer Park at Coit Tower, along with many of San Francisco's most recognized figures of the 20th century.

Michael Sanchez Sr. died on August 31, 2008, at home in Marin County where he lived under the care of family until the age of 84.

In 2012, the Sanchez family began efforts to open a second North Beach location in a vacant pizza market on Vallejo Street. However, their plan was ultimately abandoned. Vince Sanchez of Mama’s cited stalled zoning changes and mounting costs as reasons for their decision.

=== Food ===
Mama's serves a variety of breakfast dishes that include omelettes, eggs Benedicts, French toast, and pancakes. Lunch items include sandwiches, burgers, entree salads, and side orders such as homemade fries, bagels, yogurt, and fresh fruit. Beverages include lemonade, cranberry juice, apple juice, grapefruit juice, soft beverage sodas, lattes, hot chocolates, and alcoholic beverages including wine and beer.

Mama's Bake Shop sells carrot cake, poppy seed cake, homemade jam, brownies, and kugelhopf. The bakery items are available for pre-order, and can be pre-ordered 48 hours in advance. During the holiday season, Mama's Bake Shop items can be purchased in a gift basket.

== Hours and location ==
Mama's is located at 1701 Stockton St., at the edge of Washington Square Park. The restaurant is easily accessible by MUNI and cable car.

Mama's is open from Tuesday to Sunday, from 8 am to 3 pm, and is closed on Mondays.

== Reviews and news coverage ==
In a June 2010 USA Today article, restaurant guide Zagat recommended Mama's for its Northwest omelette. Zagat also mentioned Mama's for "pancakes that are as light as a feather - close to perfect." The restaurant has been recommended by food critiques from KQED's Check, Please! Bay Area, Time's travel guide, and the Travel Channel.
