= Caffe Trieste =

Coffeehouse in San Francisco, California

Coordinates: 37.79872°N 122.40727°W

- Interactive map of Caffe Trieste

Restaurant information
- Established: 1956
- Location: California, United States

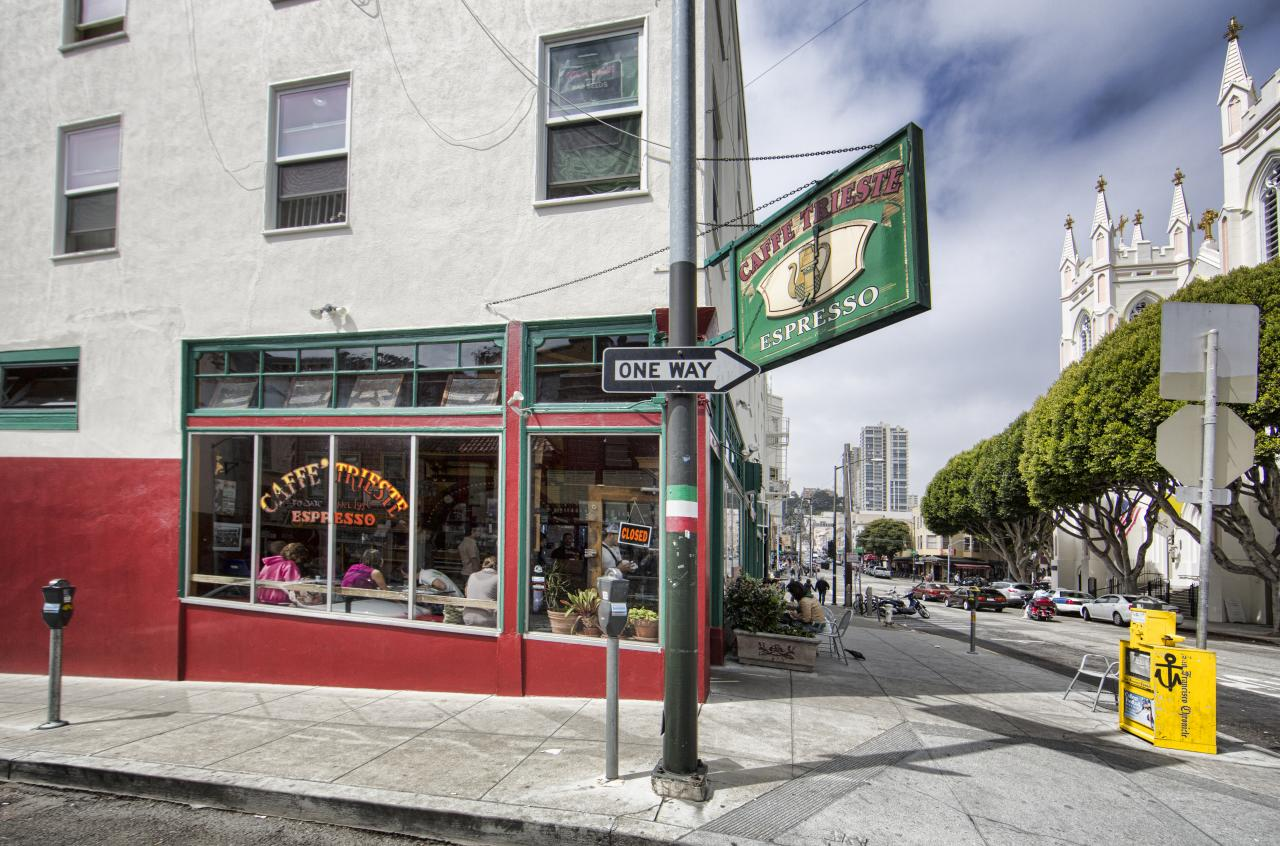
Caffè Trieste in North Beach

Caffè Trieste is an internationally known coffeehouse, retail store, and former franchise in San Francisco. The original cafe, opened in 1956, was the first espresso-based coffeehouse on the West Coast of the United States. Caffe Trieste is considered a San Francisco institution and a local hub for poets, writers, and beat culture.

== History ==
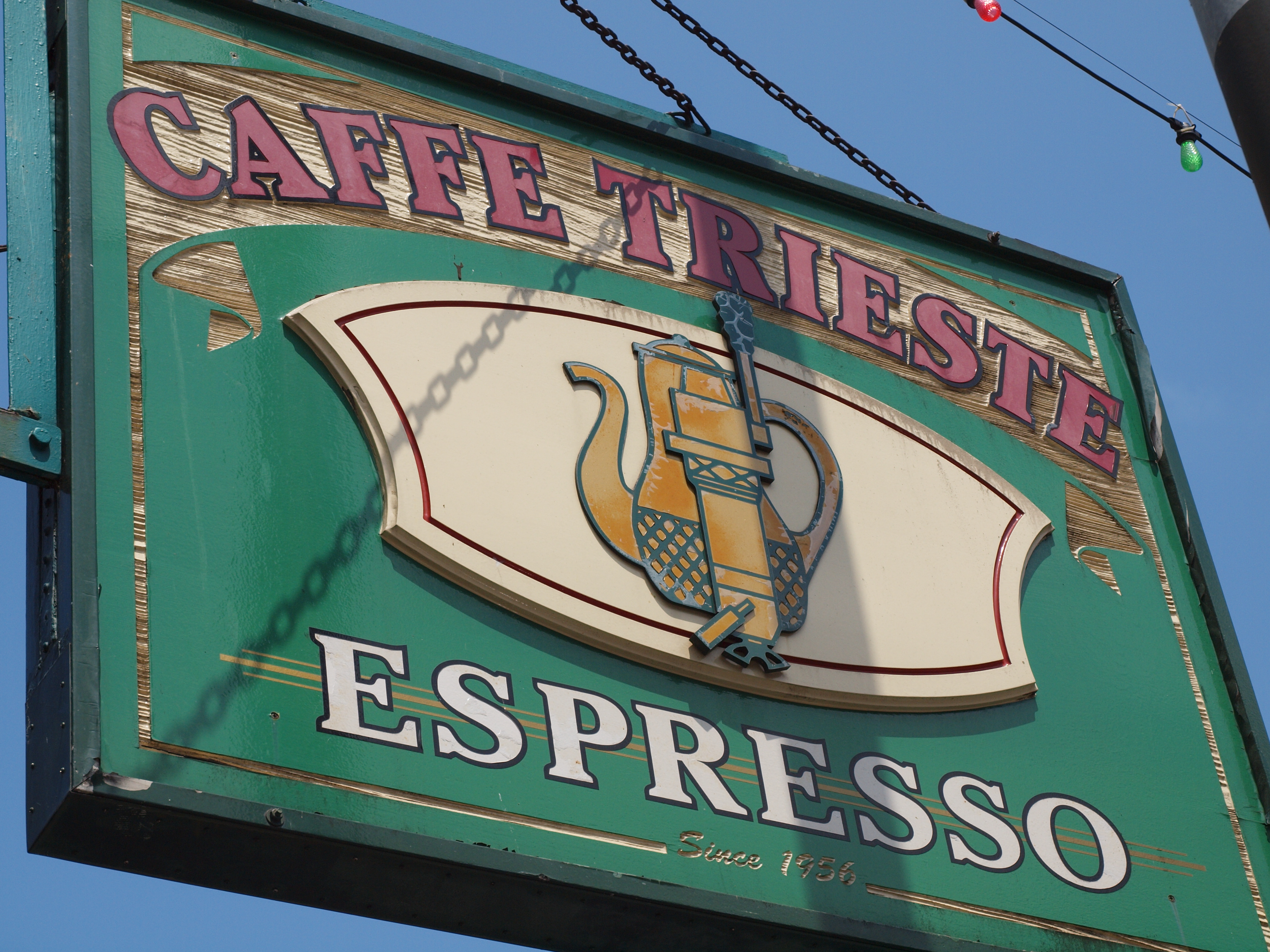

In 1951, Giovanni Giotta (aka "Papa Gianni," 1920–2016) and his family emigrated to the United States from Italy. He was born and raised in the small fishing town of Rovigno D'Istria, Croatia (a part of Italy before World War II and an Italian-speaking part of the former Habsburg Austria-Hungary), and lived in Monfalcone, Italy from 1947 to 1951. When Giotta first came to San Francisco, he experienced financial difficulties. He approached the priests at Saints Peter and Paul Church for help. As he explained, "We had nothing, no place to stay, no bread to eat. The father put us with a family and found me a job.” He worked as a window washer and was known to sing while working.

In the United States, Giotta missed the espresso and the coffeehouses of Trieste in Italy. A cozy central European Habsburg coffeehouse culture had established itself there. American coffee culture of the 1950s focused on instant coffee that people made at home; people would purchase pre-ground beans that typically lacked flavor. By contrast, Trieste had a rich cafe history. It had been a part of both the Austro-Hungarian Empire and Italy, and was known for its blend of Italian, Austrian, Balkan, Greek, Venetian, and Jewish cultural influences. It was also known for its literary residents, such as James Joyce and Italo Svevo. The city of Trieste itself was also famous for its coffee. In 1719, Trieste had become a "free port" under Hapsburg law, and it became a key point in the trade of coffee beans from the Middle East to Europe. Cafes began to sprout up in Trieste as early as 1748; some historic cafes, such as Cafe Tommaseo (founded in 1830) and Caffè degli Specchi (founded in 1839) still exist in the twenty-first century. Coffee brands, such as Hausbrandt (founded in 1892) and Illy (founded in 1933) were also established in the city.

In 1956, Giotta received the opportunity to take over Piccola Cafe, a small business located at 601 Vallejo Street in the North Beach. He renamed his new business Caffè Trieste, after the city of Trieste. The cafe was the first espresso house on the West Coast. Giotta imported and roasted the beans, which were not yet common in American cafe culture. The cafe quickly became popular among the neighborhood's primarily Italian residents. "It was all Italian people," Giotta said of the neighborhood, "But I got the American people to like cappuccino." For decades, the cafe has been known to have opera singers on Saturday.

Franchise locations were opened in Sausalito (1970s-2008), Berkeley (2004), Oakland, and Monterey. In 2016, Caffe Trieste became a legacy business in San Francisco. That same year, Giotta died. In 2017, a family dispute broke out over the management and future of the business. As a result, the Berkeley and Oakland locations, which were under the ownership of 4 Musketeers, S.P. LLC, severed ties with Caffe Trieste and changed the names of the locations in 2017. They cited the family dispute as the reason behind the move.

== Meeting place for authors and artists ==
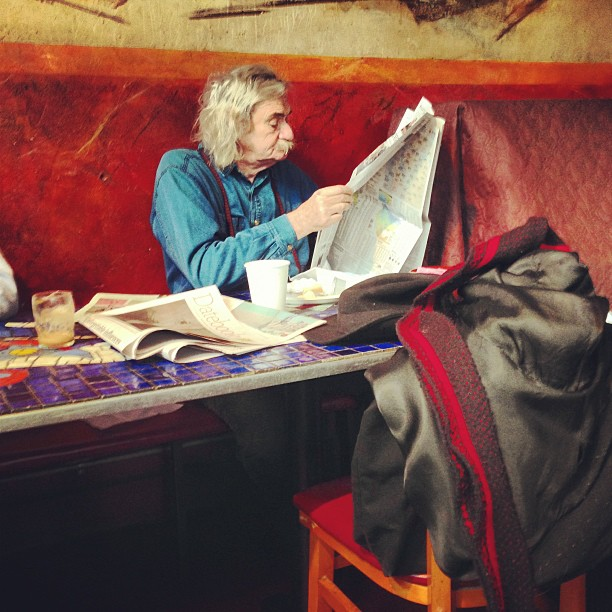
Jack Hirschman (February 2013)

Caffè Trieste became a meeting place for Beat movement writers such as Lawrence Ferlinghetti (a lifelong regular), Alan Watts, Jack Kerouac, Allen Ginsberg, Richard Brautigan, Bob Kaufman, Gregory Corso, Michael McClure, Kenneth Rexroth, and Neeli Cherkovski, who lived in North Beach in the 1950s and 1960s. Jack Hirschman, former Poet Laureate of San Francisco, has also been a regular patron. In addition to other writers and poets, painters such as Peter Le Blanc and Don Moses and photographers Joe Rosenthal (Pulitzer Prize winner), Christopher Michel, Jimo Perini, and Christopher Felver, other celebrities counting themselves among the Trieste Aficionados include Paul Kantner, Lulu Schwartz, Jack Sarfatti, Joey Reynolds and Mal Sharpe.

San Francisco politician Aaron Peskin is also a cafe regular.

Local figures have discussed the cultural impact of the cafe. As described by Mark Bittner, "I think of Caffe Trieste as one of the last strongholds—actually the true center— of what made this neighborhood so fabulous." Tony Long, local journalist and author, described it as the "living room" of its regulars. Jack Hirschman remembered, "When I arrived in 1972, (Papa Gianni’s sister) Iolanda fed me for about 6 months because I had no money. Much later, before the official celebration at Koret Auditorium for my becoming Poet Laureate, Ida and The Trieste held a party for me first."

The cafe has been featured in several movies, on television, radio, in magazines, and in dozens of photography, tourism and other books, ranging from local to national and international in scope. Francis Ford Coppola wrote much of the screenplay for The Godfather while sitting in the Caffè Trieste.

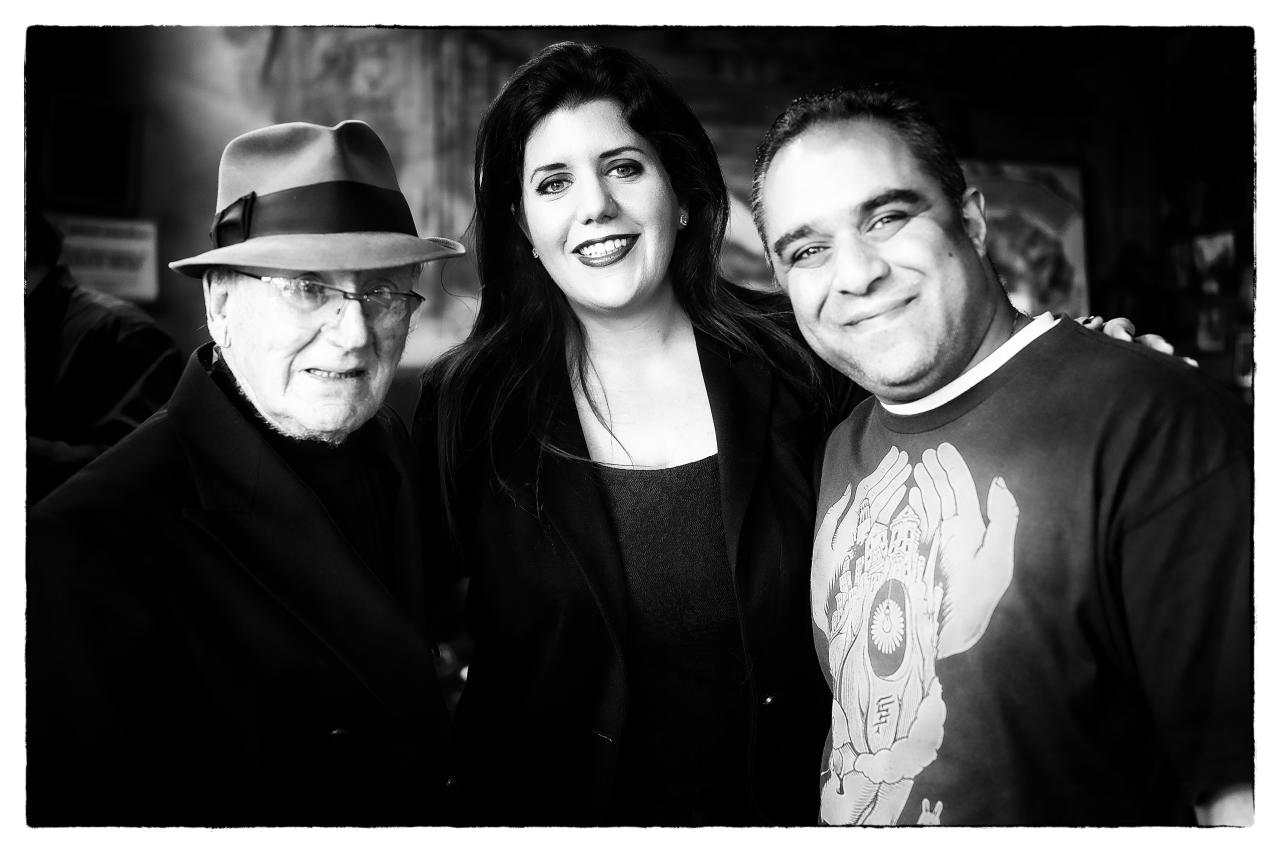
Papa Gianni (left) in 2013

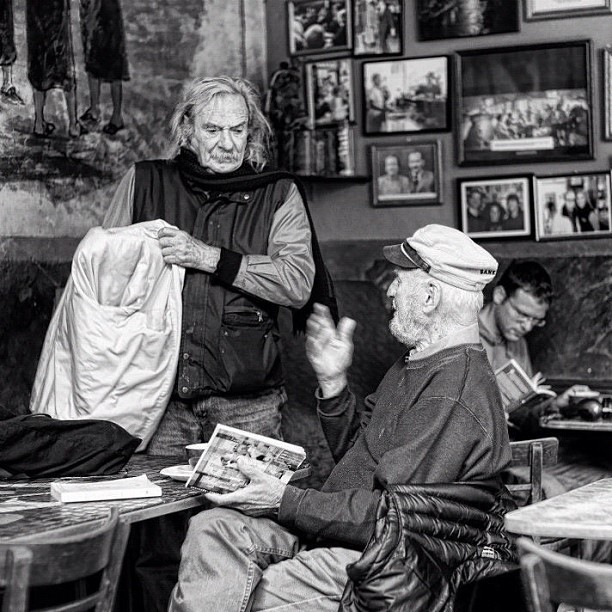
Jack Hirschman & Lawrence Ferlinghetti

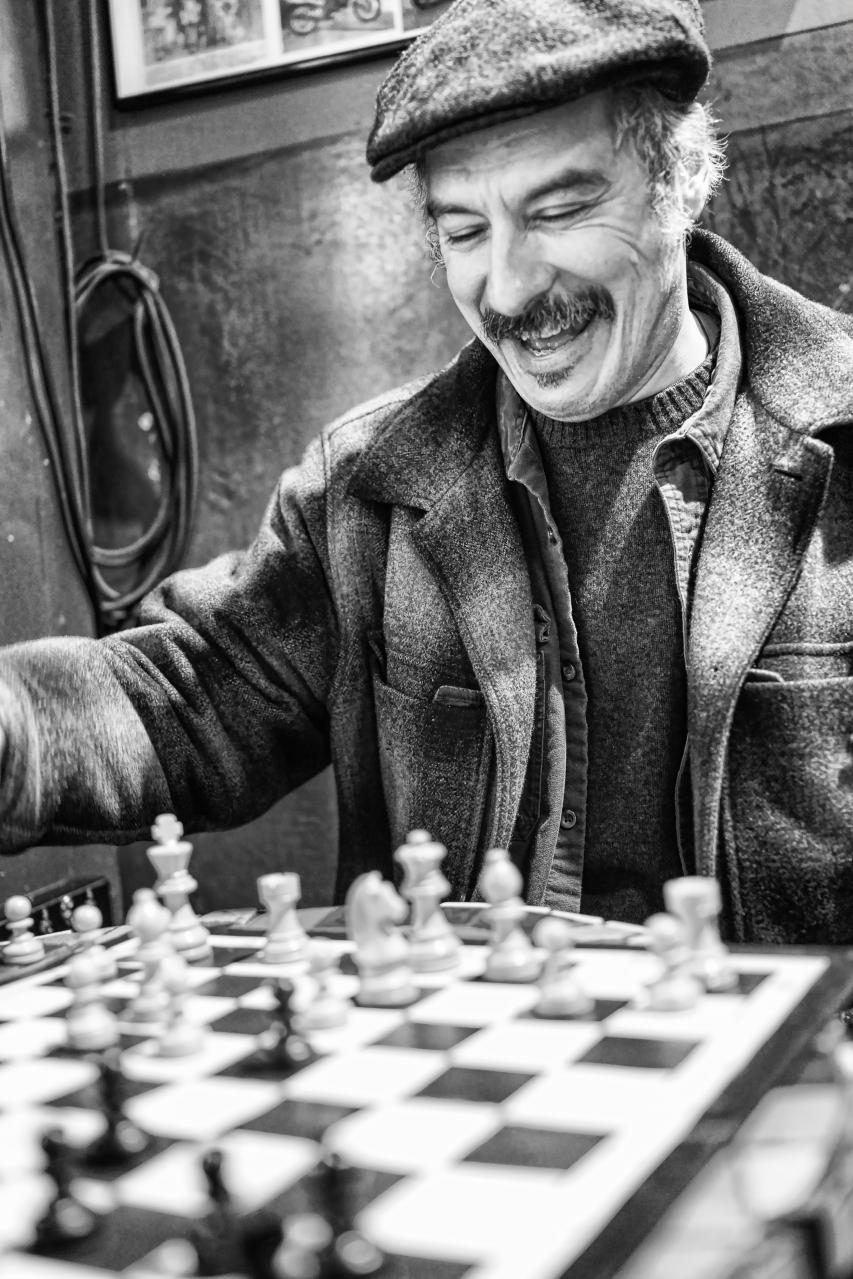
Playing chess

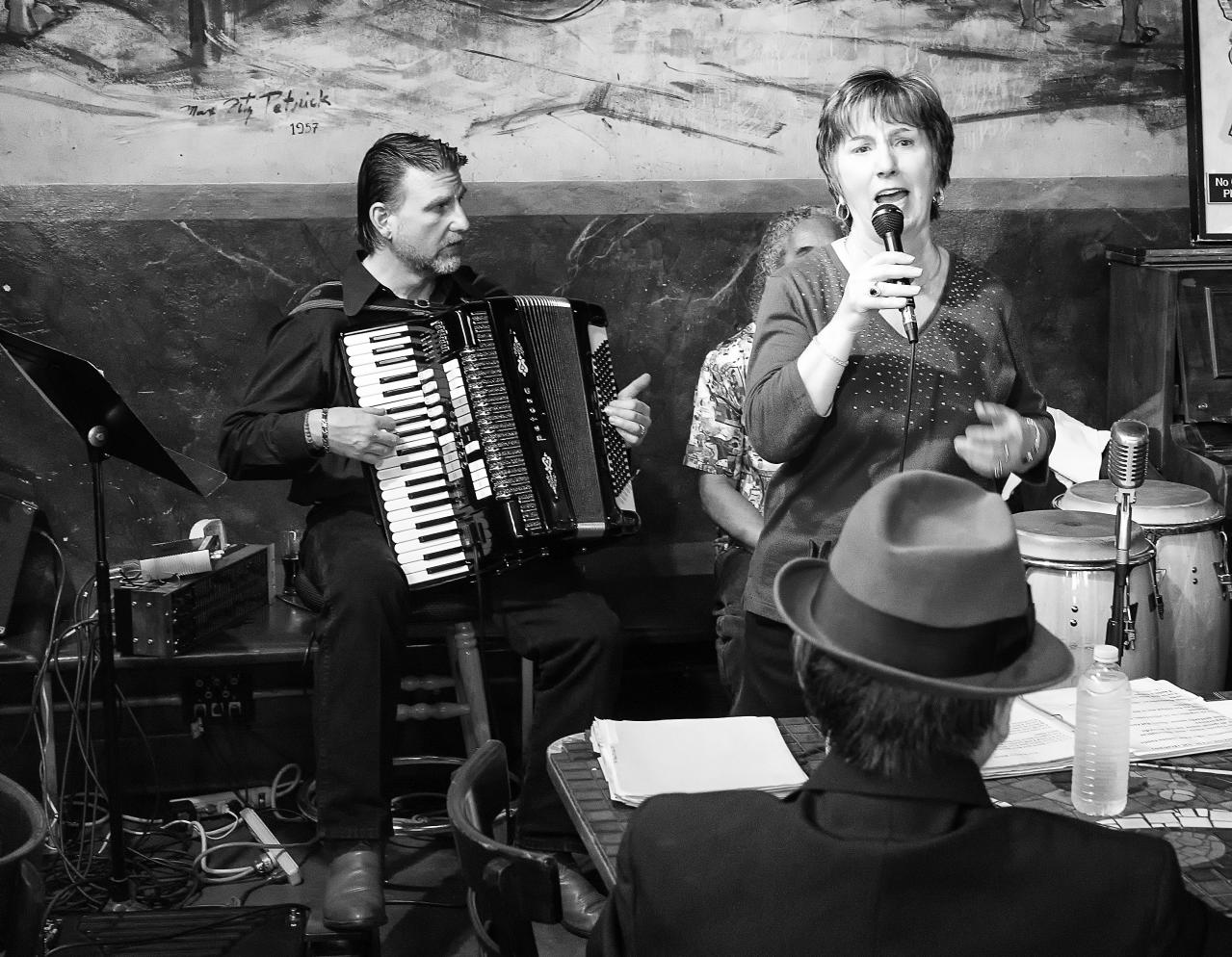
Music

== See also ==
- List of coffeehouse chains
