= Getting Even with Dad =

1994 film by Howard Deutch

- Theatrical release poster
- Directed by: Howard Deutch
- Written by: Tom S. Parker; Jim Jennewein
- Produced by: Katie Jacobs
- Starring: Macaulay Culkin; Ted Danson; Glenne Headly; Saul Rubinek; Gailard Sartain; Hector Elizondo
- Cinematography: Tim Suhrstedt
- Edited by: Richard Halsey
- Music by: Miles Goodman
- Distributed by: Metro-Goldwyn-Mayer
- Release date: June 17, 1994
- Running time: 104 minutes
- Language: English
- Budget: $30 million
- Box office: $53.8 million

Getting Even with Dad is a 1994 American comedy film starring Macaulay Culkin and Ted Danson. It was released by Metro-Goldwyn-Mayer on June 17, 1994 and received negative reviews from critics, but was commercially successful, grossing $53.8 million on a budget of $30 million.

== Plot ==
Timmy Gleason is the estranged son of ex-con Ray Gleason and has been living with his aunt Kitty and her fiancée Wayne since the death of his mother some years earlier. Ray works in a bakery designing cakes. When Kitty goes on her honeymoon with new husband Wayne, she dumps Timmy on a reluctant Ray, leaving him to look after his son in San Francisco for the next week.

Timmy is hoping to spend time with his father, but is largely ignored by Ray, who is in the midst of planning a rare-coin heist with his two cronies Bobby and Carl. The robbery is successful, but Timmy learns of it and hides the stolen coins from them. He uses it to blackmail Ray into spending time with him, promising that he will return the coins afterwards. Thus father and son spend the next few days fishing, playing miniature golf and visiting amusement parks, with an amiable Carl and angry Bobby tagging along.

After Timmy suggests to Carl that he made a map of the coins' location, Carl and Bobby find a map in Ray's bedroom and decide to look for the coins on their own without Timmy or Ray. However, this sends them on a wild goose chase that results in them getting arrested for attempting to steal a chest with communion wine from a church thinking the coins were in there. Realizing the map was fake, Bobby then believes Timmy and Ray set them up.

The police are suspicious of Ray, so Detective Theresa Walsh is assigned by her superior to go undercover and surveil him. By chance, Ray and Timmy get talking to Theresa, unaware of who she really is, and invite her for a coffee and then to dinner. Theresa and Ray develop a mutual attraction, causing her boss concern over her willingness to do her job. Timmy and Ray have also gotten closer, so Timmy decides that he wants to stay with his dad permanently. He urges Ray to forget about the stolen coins, because he will probably be caught and sent back to prison. Ray refuses, so Timmy prepares to return home.

At the last moment, Ray has a change of heart. Bobby, however, appears at the bus station, where at gunpoint he forces Ray to open the locker containing the coins. Ray and Bobby are set upon by the waiting police and arrested. Ray is crushed to discover that Theresa is a cop. However, it turns out that the bag in the locker was full of pennies, so Ray is released again. At Timmy's prompting, Theresa finds the rare coins in a gym bag in a department store held by a mannequin. The coins are returned and all charges against Ray are dropped. Ray decides to take on full custody of Timmy and they prepare for a new life together.

== Cast ==
- Macaulay Culkin as Timmy Gleason, Ray's son
- Ted Danson as Ray Gleason, Timmy's widowed father
- Glenne Headly as Detective Theresa Walsh
- Saul Rubinek as Robert "Bobby" Drace
- Gailard Sartain as Carl
- Sam McMurray as Detective Alex Serransky
- Kathleen Wilhoite as Kitty Gleason, Ray's sister and Timmy's paternal aunt
- Sydney Walker as Mr. Wankmueller
- Hector Elizondo as Lt. Romayko
- Ron Canada as Zinn
- Dann Florek as Wayne, Kitty's husband and Timmy's paternal uncle
- Scott Beach as Wino

== Production ==
MGM bought the film as a spec script in a bidding war with Hollywood Pictures, Columbia, TriStar, and Paramount with MGM acquiring the script for $500,000.

Macaulay Culkin's character was supposed to have a short haircut in this movie, but Culkin, who had let his hair grow at the time, liked his looks and did not want to cut it. His father, Kit Culkin, demanded his son be allowed to keep his hair the way it was, pointing out that his character was a working-class boy and not a clean-cut, prep school one. He got to keep his long hair.

=== Locations ===
The theme park featured in the movie was Paramount's Great America located in Santa Clara, California. Ray's apartment in the movie is located at the corner of Jackson and Mason St. in Chinatown, San Francisco. The church featured in the movie is Saints Peter and Paul Catholic Church on 666 Filbert Street in San Francisco. The miniature golf course was filmed at Scandia Family Fun Center located in Rohnert Park, California. The ice rink was located in Berkeley, California. Principal photography took place between July and October 1993.

== Reception ==
=== Box office ===
Getting Even with Dad grossed $18.8 million in the United States and Canada and $35 million in other territories, for a worldwide total of $53.8 million.

=== Critical response ===
On the review aggregator website Rotten Tomatoes, 3% of 31 critics' reviews are positive, with an average rating of 3.7/10. The website's consensus reads: "Overly formulaic and tonally inconsistent, Getting Even with Dad tries for a sentimental conclusion it doesn't earn and winds up a slapsticky cash grab aimed at fans of Home Alone." Metacritic, which uses a weighted average, assigned the film a score of 31 out of 100, based on 26 critics, indicating "generally unfavorable" reviews. Audiences surveyed by CinemaScore gave the film a grade "B" on scale of A to F.

Desson Howe of The Washington Post gave the film a negative review explaining that "after plying the audience with formulaic predictability, Getting Even doesn't even have the decency to end quickly. Minutes away from sending the audience home, it chooses to fall asleep on the job." Roger Ebert of the Chicago Sun-Times gave the film a more mixed two out of four stars saying, "It wants to be a caper, a comedy, a romance, and a showcase for Macaulay Culkin. That's too much of a stretch."

== Year-end lists ==
- Dishonorable mention – Glenn Lovell, San Jose Mercury News
- Worst (not ranked) – Bob Ross, The Tampa Tribune
