= Filbert Street (San Francisco) =

Street in San Francisco

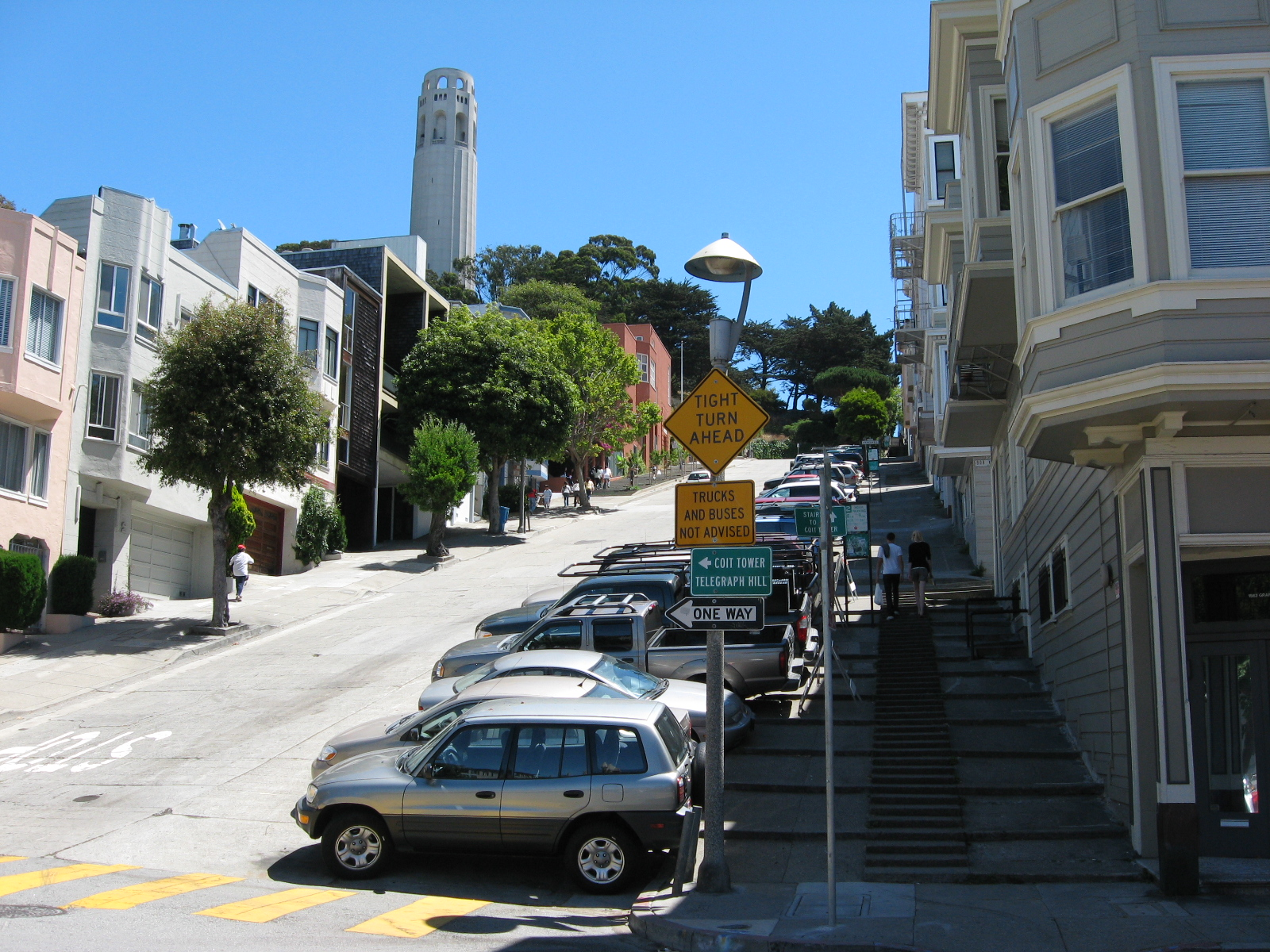
- Looking east up Filbert Street toward Coit Tower
- Interactive map of Filbert Street
- Location: San Francisco, California
- East end: The Embarcadero
- Major junctions: Columbus Avenue; US 101 (Van Ness Avenue)
- West end: Lyon Street at the Presidio

Filbert Street is an east–west street on the north side of San Francisco, California. The street runs for 2.5 mi (4.0 km) from The Embarcadero to its western terminus at Lyon Street, which runs parallel to the western wall of The Presidio. The eastern portion of Filbert Street, east of Kearny Street in the Telegraph Hill and North Waterfront area, consists mainly of walkways and step streets. Along its route, Filbert Street passes through the neighborhoods of North Waterfront, Telegraph Hill, North Beach, Russian Hill, Golden Gate Valley, and Cow Hollow. Addresses on Filbert Street run from east to west.

== Attractions and characteristics ==
=== Levi's Plaza ===
The easternmost stretch of Filbert Street is a walkway through Levi's Plaza, which was built starting in 1979 and completed in 1981. Until the 1970s, this stretch of Filbert Street was a drivable street that intersected with The Embarcadero.

=== Filbert Steps ===
The Filbert Steps are a residential step street that climbs Telegraph Hill over a series of 400 steps, with houses and public gardens on either side of the steps. A drivable portion of Montgomery Street intersects with the Filbert Steps, dividing it into upper and lower portions. The art deco Malloch Building, famous for its appearance in the 1947 film noir Dark Passage, is at the intersection of Montgomery and Filbert Steps.

The Filbert Steps are the best known of several step streets on Telegraph Hill.

=== Washington Square and Saints Peter and Paul Church ===
Between Stockton and Powell Streets, just east of Columbus Avenue, Filbert Street forms the northern boundary of Washington Square. Across the street is the historic Saints Peter and Paul Church. This area is in the gap between Telegraph and Russian Hills, in North Beach, historically an Italian-American neighborhood, and still having a number of legacy Italian businesses. On the northeast corner of Filbert and Stockton, opposite to Washington Square, is Liguria Bakery, a focacceria that has been in business since 1911. A block west, on the corner of Powell Street, is the Victoria Pastry Company, a cake shop and pasticceria that has been in business since 1914.

=== Filbert Street grade ===
On the half-block west of Leavenworth Street, on the east side of Russian Hill, there is a steep portion of Filbert Street that has a maximum gradient of 31.5%. Only downhill, eastbound traffic is allowed on this half-block. It is mistakenly thought to be the steepest street in San Francisco that allows automobile traffic. The city actually has a number of steeper streets, and this block of Filbert ties with several other city blocks as being the sixth steepest street in the San Francisco.

=== Old Vedanta Society Temple ===
In the Cow Hollow area (or by some accounts, Golden Gate Valley), at the southwest corner of Filbert and Webster Streets, is the Old Vedanta Society Temple, a building belonging to the Vedanta Society that has the distinction of being the oldest Hindu temple in the United States. The building is known for its highly unusual architecture, being a Queen Anne Victorian structure, but having a series of towers with different rooftop types representing different styles of architecture from around the world, including castle-style battlements, onion domes, and rooftop styles derived from temple architecture in India.

== Gallery ==
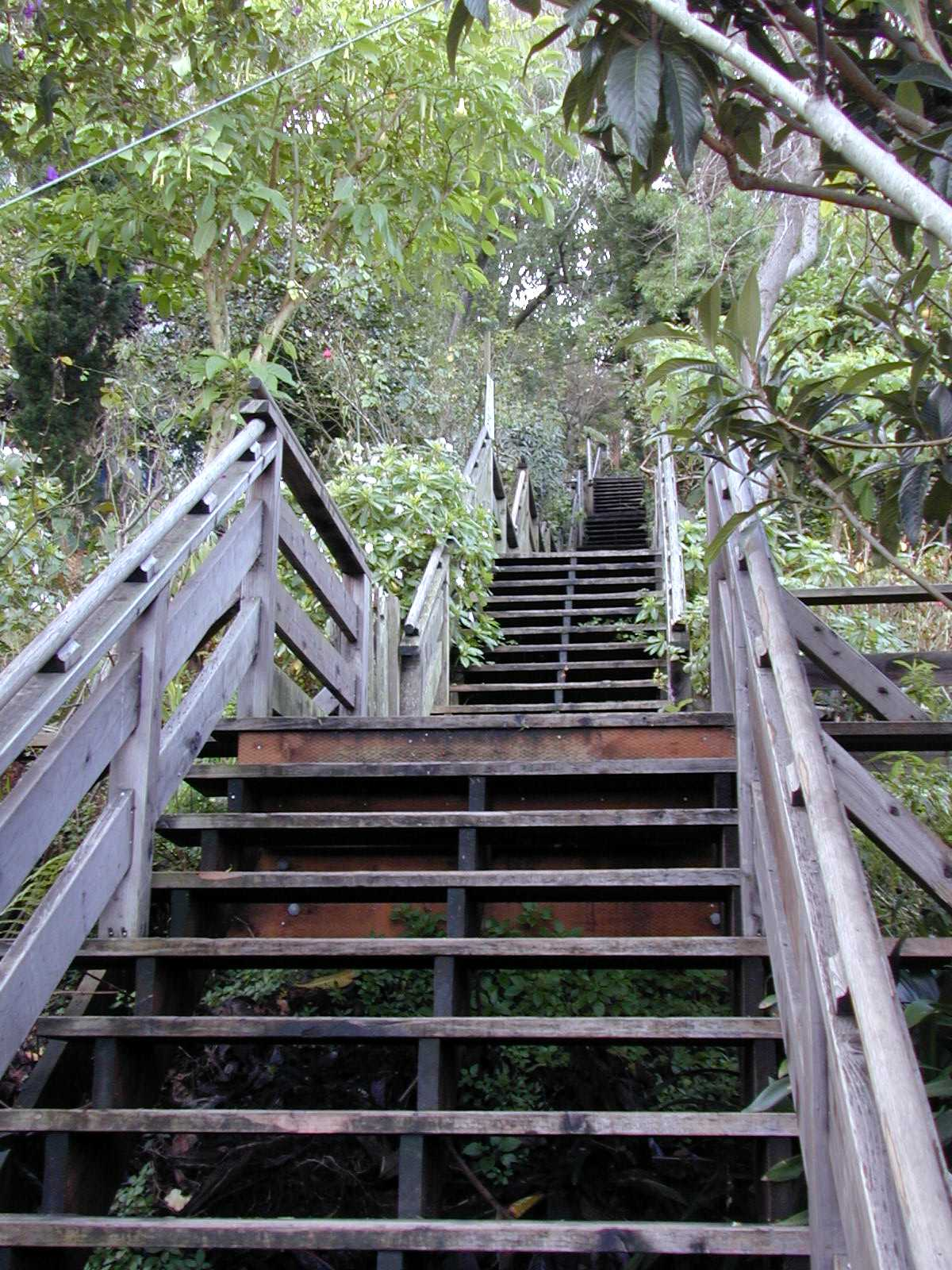
The Filbert Street Steps, Telegraph Hill

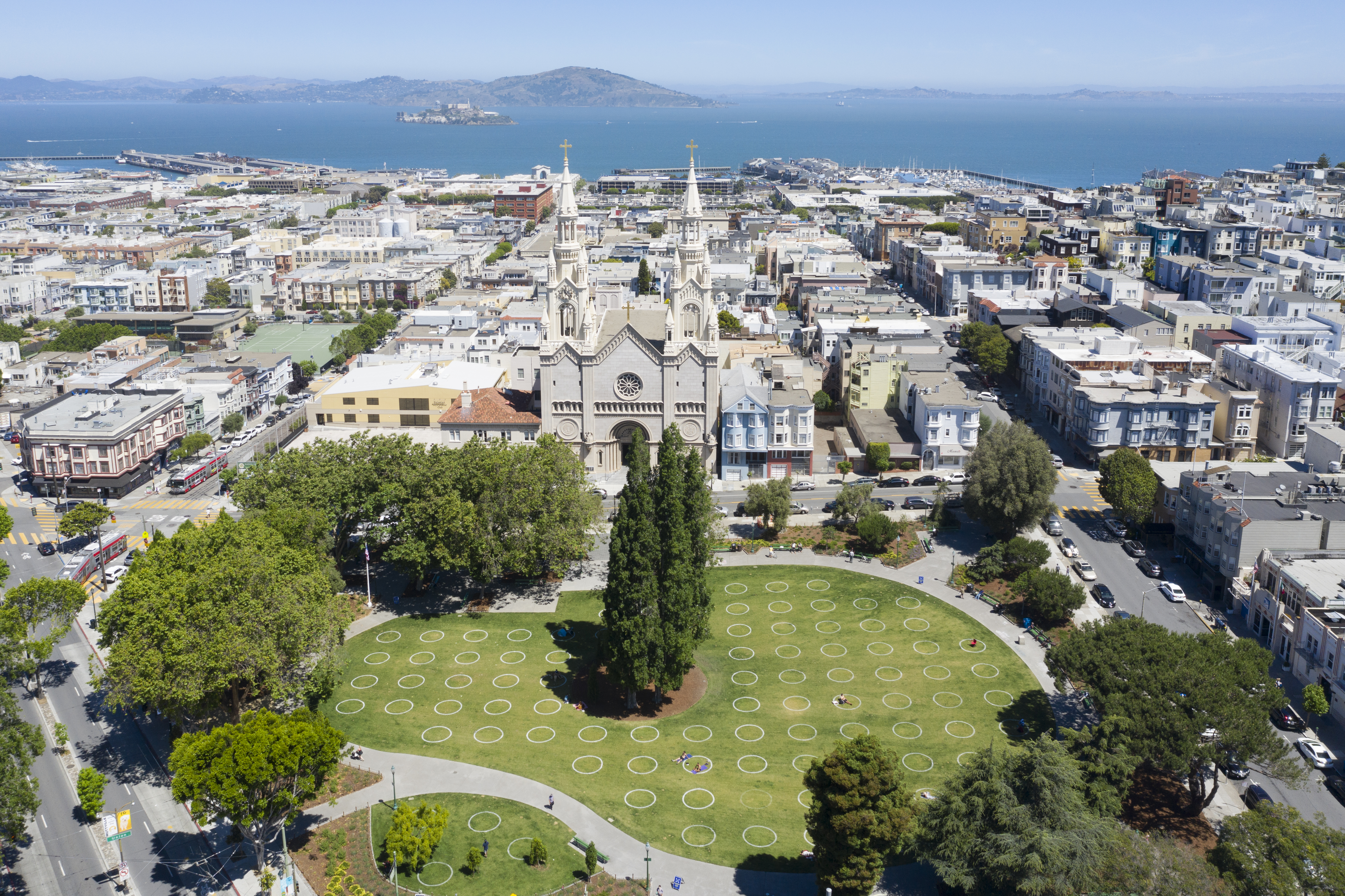
Washington Square, and Saints Peter & Paul Church

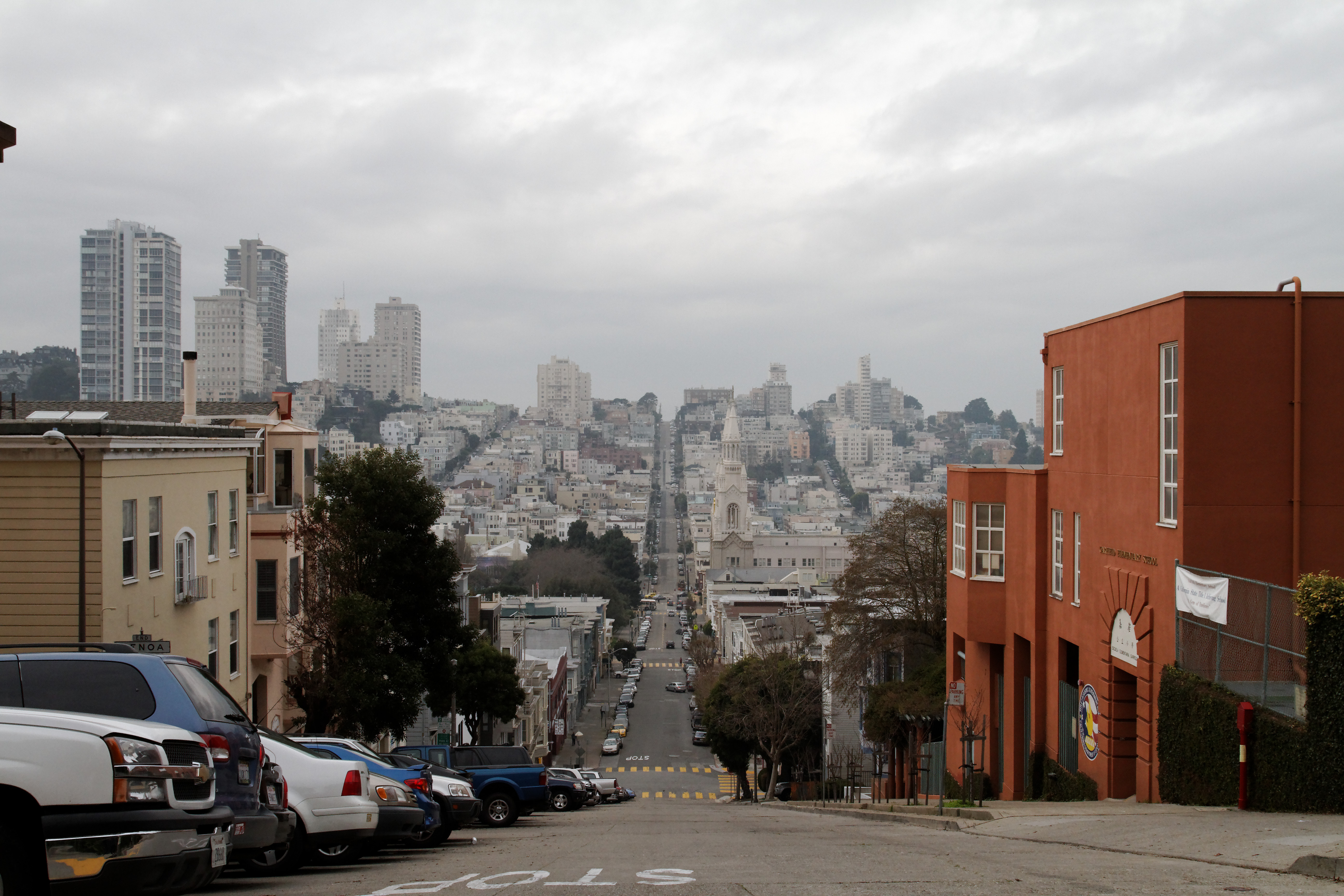
Looking west toward Russian Hill from Telegraph Hill

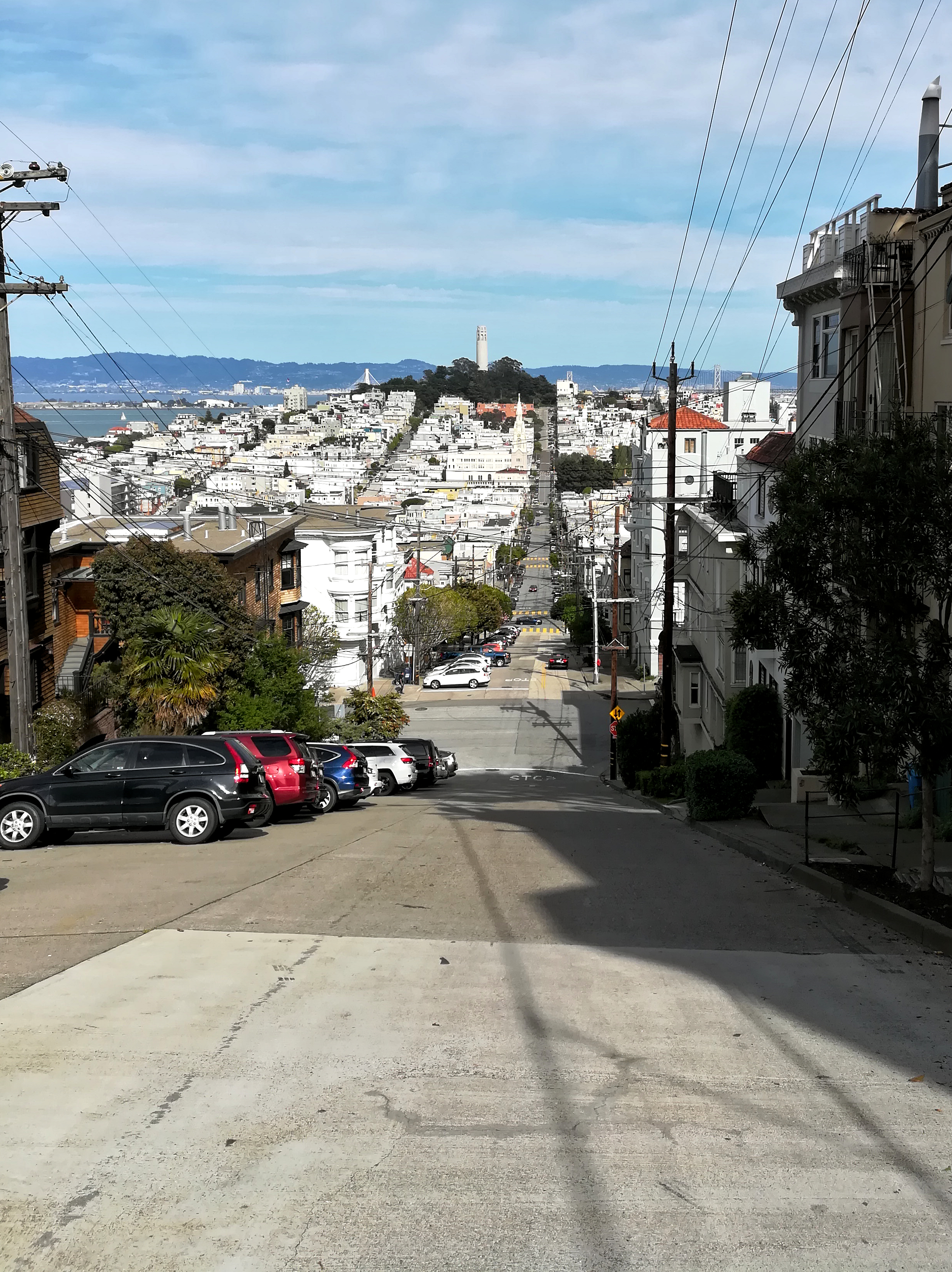
Looking east toward Telegraph Hill from Russian Hill

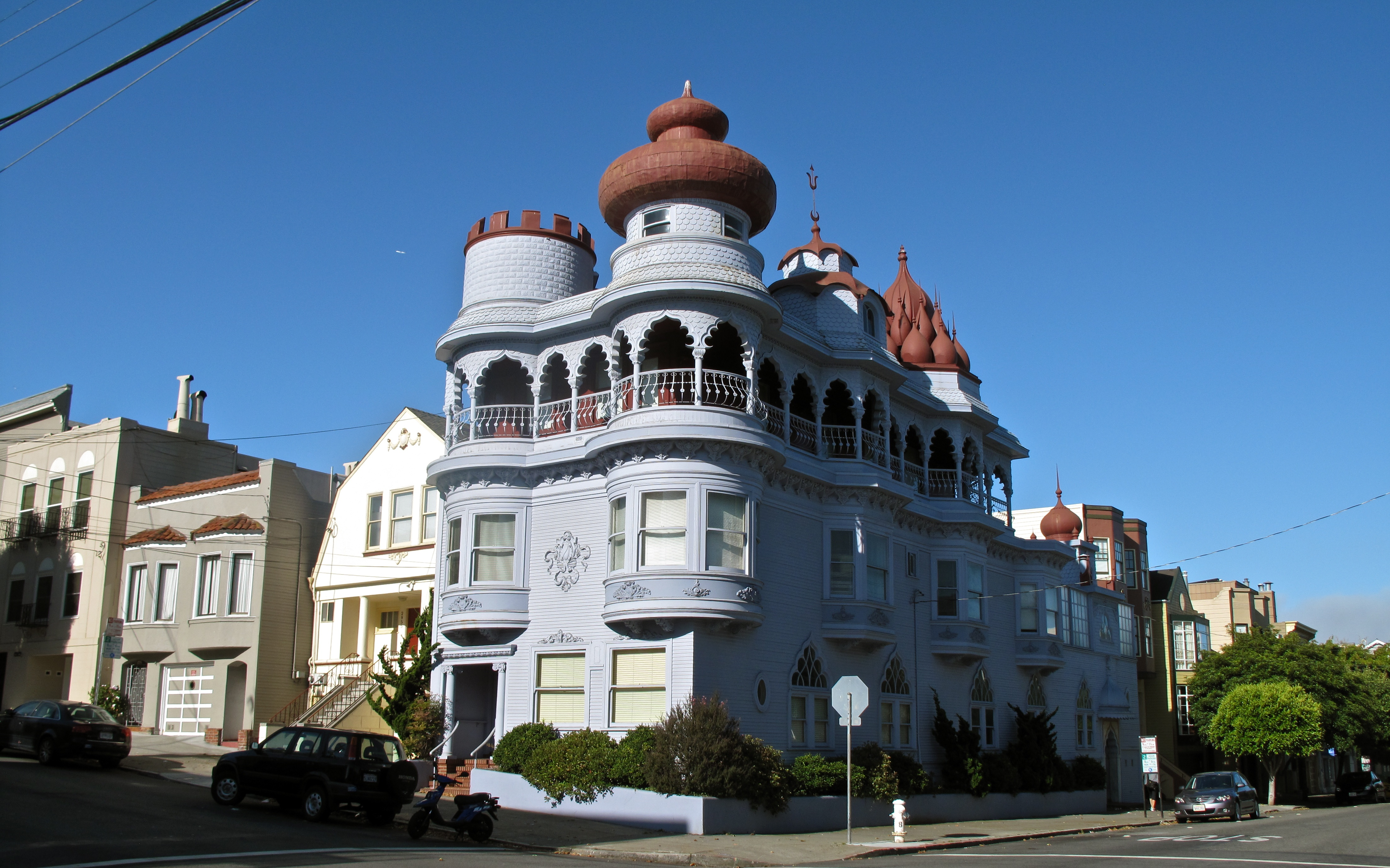
Old Vedanta Society Temple, Filbert & Webster

== See also ==
- Union Street (San Francisco)
