= Mal Sharpe =

American broadcaster (1936–2020)

- Born: Malcolm Sharpe; April 2, 1936; Cambridge, Massachusetts, U.S.
- Died: March 10, 2020 (aged 83); Berkeley, California, U.S.
- Occupations: Radio host, comedian
- Employer: KGO

Malcolm Sharpe (April 2, 1936 – March 10, 2020) was an American television and radio personality with roots in San Francisco, California.

== Life and career ==
In the early 1960s, the Cambridge, Massachusetts-born Sharpe collaborated with Jim Coyle to create a series of comic on-the-street interviews for San Francisco radio station KGO. Armed with a tape recorder, Coyle and Sharpe confronted pedestrians with unusual questions or strange behavior. In a 1964 interview with Newsweek magazine, Sharpe explained "We try to pose an almost plausible question, then proceed step by step into absurdity until the interviewee is seething."

After four years of recording short skits for KGO, Coyle and Sharpe recorded a hidden camera television pilot in 1964 called The Imposters with host George Fenneman but it remained unsold and was never aired in full. A 2006 four disc box set of 1960s material titled These 2 Men Are Impostors contains The Imposters pilot in addition to KGO radio recordings and previously unreleased pranks. Along with Coyle, he also recorded two comedy albums of street pranks in 1964 for the Warner Brothers record label. As a solo performer, he later released two albums.

In 1968, Sharpe conducted a series of man-on-the-street interviews for a sequence in the film Head starring the Monkees. Most of Sharpe's questions were omitted from the film "for effect", though he is heard asking "Are you telling me that you don't see the connection between government and laughing at people?" Selections from the sequence was edited into the track "Poll" on the film's soundtrack album.

In 1971, Sharpe continued as a solo interviewer with a syndicated TV series titled The Street People. In the 1980s he hosted a series of public television specials titled Mal Sharpe's San Francisco which included a mixture of new material and older clips.

Sharpe was a "trad jazz" fan and said that he moved to San Francisco after seeing a Turk Murphy's Jazz Band album cover. He began playing the trombone at 15, and although he "had not kept it up", a chance request to sit in with a jazz group led to a regular gig at a North Beach, San Francisco nightclub in the late 1950s. In the 1980s he established his own Big Money In Jazz band. They regularly appeared at venues such as the Savoy Tivoli and Enrico’s in San Francisco and the No Name Bar in Sausalito.

Sharpe resided in Berkeley, California, with his wife. He hosted a jazz show, Back on Basin Street, from 9:00 to 11:00 p.m. Sunday Pacific Time on KCSM at the College of San Mateo in California. The final Back on Basin Street was aired on Sunday, March 25, 2012. He died on March 10, 2020, of complications from heart surgery at the age of 83.
