= Coyle and Sharpe =

American comedy duo

Coyle and Sharpe were a United States comedy duo appearing on the radio during the early 1960s. Composed of Jim Coyle (1932–1993) and Malcolm Sharpe (1936-2020), the duo's typical format was to satirize the "vox populi" interview, with off-the-wall questions posed to passers-by in a generally deadpan style as though it were a serious interview.

== History ==
Jim Coyle was born in 1932. Mal Sharpe was born in 1936 in Boston.

Coyle and Sharpe began their comedy team in 1958 in a boarding house. On their official website, Jim Coyle is described as a "benign conman who talked his way into 119 jobs by the time he was 25". At the time of their meeting, Mal Sharpe had just graduated from college and was interested in the burgeoning San Francisco scene.

In 1964, the duo was hired by radio station KGO (AM) in San Francisco to pull pranks, or as they jokingly referred to them, "terrorizations." The radio show was called Coyle and Sharpe On The Loose. Shortly after these broadcasts aired, they released two records on the Warner Bros. label: The Absurd Imposters and The Insane Minds Of Coyle And Sharpe.

In 1963 Coyle & Sharpe shot a few skits on San Francisco's Market Street, and soon they made a pilot for a TV show in Los Angeles.

The TV show never materialized, and the duo broke up in 1965. Coyle died in February 1993 of complications from diabetes; he was survived by his wife Naomi. Mal Sharpe continued to do the man on the street interviews.

In the year 2000, Sharpe hosted a centennial exhibit at the Whitney Museum called "The American Century". Coyle and Sharpe were featured in the Soundworks Exhibit for this presentation.

== Discography ==
- The Absurd Imposters (Warner Bros., 1963)
- The Insane (But Hilarious) Minds of Coyle and Sharpe (Warner Bros., 1964)
- Coyle & Sharpe On The Loose (2.13.61, 1995) — re-issued material
- Coyle And Sharpe — Audio Visionaries (Thirsty Ear Recordings, 2000) — re-issued material

== See also ==
- Bob and Ray
