= Liguria Bakery =

Bakery in San Francisco, California, US

Coordinates: 37.8014°N 122.4093°W

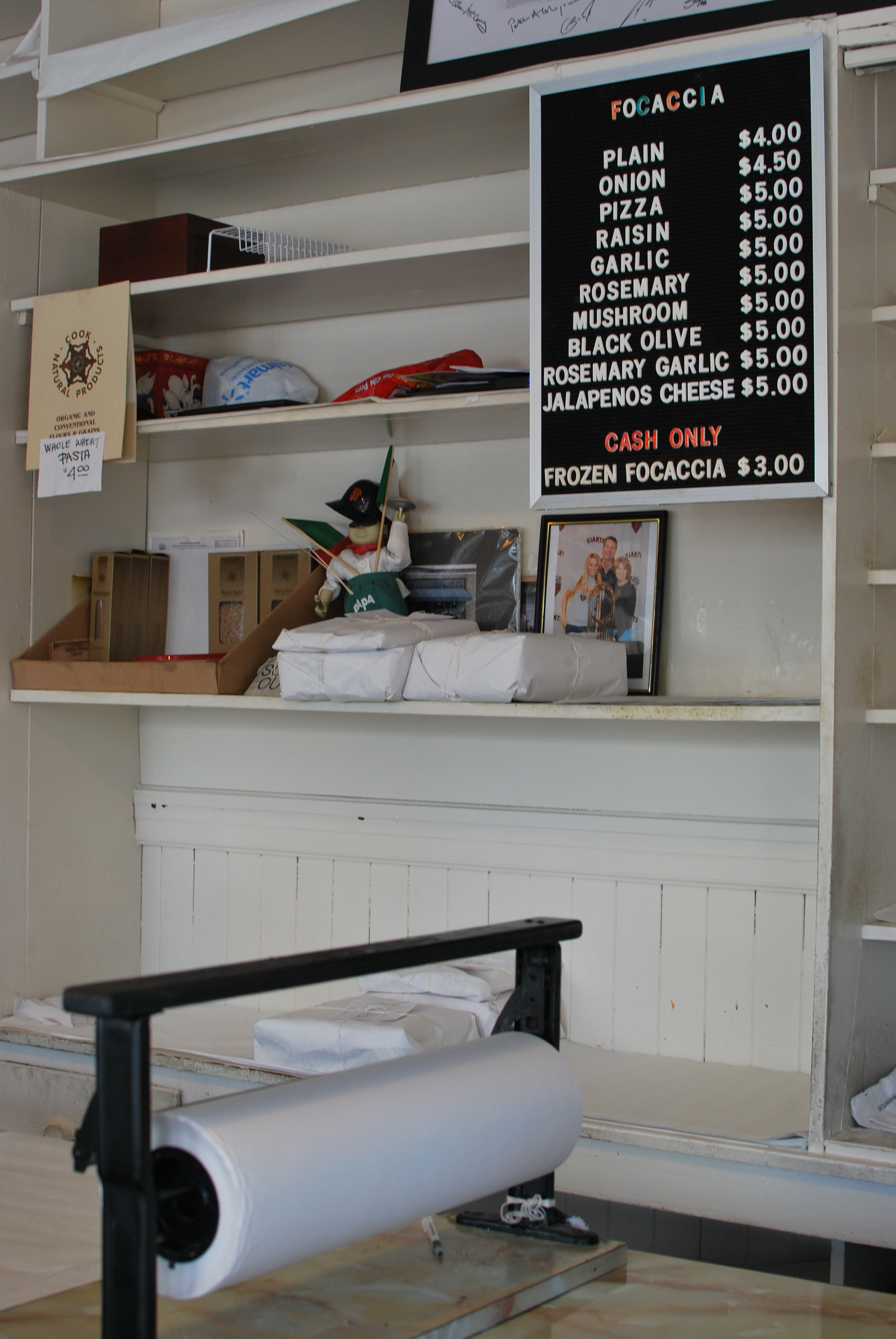
Liguria Bakery in 2011

Liguria Bakery is a bakery in the North Beach neighborhood of San Francisco, California, United States that sells only focaccia. It is located on 1700 Stockton Street, at the corner of Filbert Street and across from Washington Square Park in North Beach.

== History ==
The bakery was founded in 1911 by Ambrogio Soracco, with the help of his two brothers Giovanni and Giuseppe, on a site previously occupied by a church. Soracco had emigrated to San Francisco in 1907 from Chiavari, near Genoa in Italy. After working at another San Francisco bakery, he brought his brothers to San Francisco and they founded their own bakery. On Ambrogio Soracco's death in 1938, his brothers sold their shares in the bakery. Ambrogio Soracco's wife Mary and her new partners ran the business with hired bakers for eight years until her son, George Soracco, was old enough to become a baker himself, and by 2000 the Soracco family had repurchased the other two shares. The bakery continues to be run by the third generation of the Soracco family, and is one of the oldest businesses in North Beach.

Originally a full-service bakery, the Liguria Bakery began specializing in focaccia in 1950 after facing heavy competition in other types of bread from larger bakeries. By 1984, it had stopped producing anything but focaccia, which it sells to local stores and restaurants as well as to individual customers at its own facility.

== In popular culture ==
Liguria Bakery was featured on season 2, episode 7 of the Reef Television series City Bakes hosted by Paul Hollywood.
