= Washington Square (San Francisco) =

Park in the North Beach district of San Francisco, California

Washington Square Park
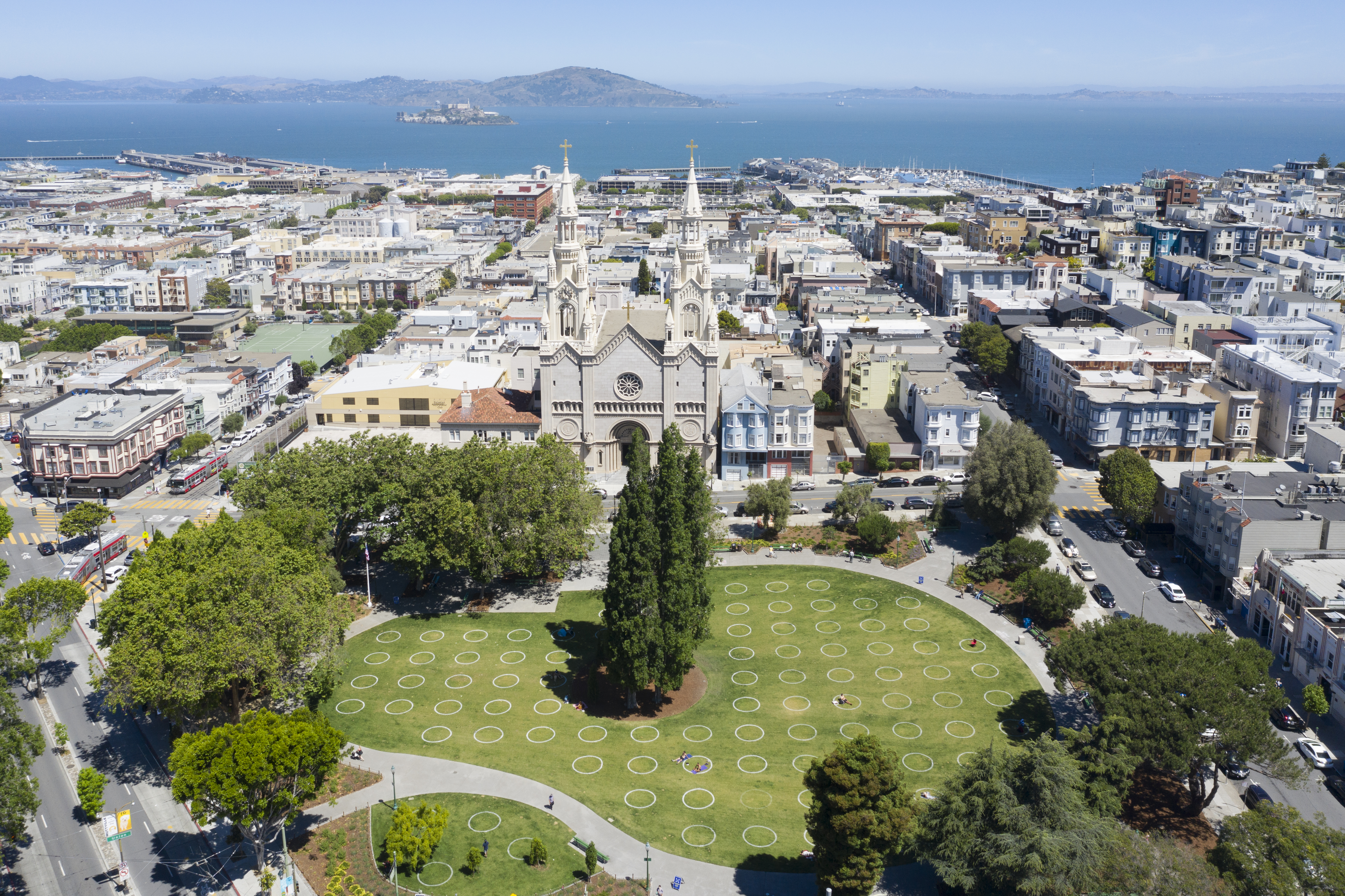
- Aerial view of Washington Square in North Beach (with social distancing circles during the COVID-19 pandemic)
- Interactive map of Washington Square Park
- Type: Urban park
- Location: North Beach district, San Francisco, California
- Coordinates: 37.800868°N 122.410001°W
- Area: 2.8 acres (1.1 ha; 0.0044 mi^{2}; 0.011 km^{2})
- Created: 1847
- Owner: San Francisco Recreation & Parks Department
- Operator: San Francisco Recreation & Parks Department
- Open: All year, 5 a.m. to Midnight
- Parking: Street parking

Washington Square is an 2.8-acre (1.1 ha) park in the North Beach district of San Francisco. It was established in 1847 and is one of the city's first parks. The park is bordered by sidewalk cafes and restaurants such as Mama's (restaurant), Tony’s Pizza Napoletana, and Park Tavern restaurants and the Liguria Bakery, as well as Sts. Peter and Paul Church.

== History ==
In the 19th century, the area was used by the Mexican rancher Juana Briones to grow potatoes and raise cattle, before it was designated a city square in 1847 when surveyor Jasper O'Farrell laid out San Francisco's street grid. It became an unofficial dump next to a cemetery, but by the 1860s, it hosted Fourth of July celebrations, and later Columbus Day celebrations and Italian festivals.

Originally, it was a complete rectangle, all the way to Powell Street. But in 1873–75, the City built Columbus Avenue, then known as Montgomery, cutting through the square. The avenue was built, evidently, because business and banking interests in the Financial District wanted greater interaction with North Beach, which was isolated, geographically, by the hills, the Barbary Coast, and Chinatown.

Washington Square was a place of refuge for many fleeing fires on Telegraph Hill, notably in 1894 and 1901. It was home for a year for some 600 people who lived in wooden barracks and Army tents after the 1906 earthquake and fire.

=== Ben Franklin statue ===
The base of the statue is a temperance fountain donated in 1879 by temperance crusader Henry D. Cogswell.

=== Marini Plaza ===
Separated from the main park by Columbus Avenue, Marini Plaza is a tiny park at the corner of Union and Powell streets, named after civic benefactor Frank Marini (1862–1952).

=== Committee to Beautify ===
In the 1950s, a coalition of community groups, the committee to Beautify Washington Square, spearheaded an effort to redesign the square, eliminating the paths that criss-crossed the park. Landscape architects Francis McCarthy and Douglas Baylis put Lombardy poplar trees in the center of a grassy expanse encircled by paths lined with benches, the configuration seen today. Although Lawrence Halprin is often credited with the design, his plans exceeded the available budget. In 1958, the City tried to solve the parking problem by putting a parking garage under the square, a plan that was defeated then but resurfaced periodically until the park was granted landmark status in 2000.

== Popular culture ==
Washington Square has been featured in many movies. Director Don Siegel featured Sts. Peter and Paul Church and the nearby Dante Building, as settings of sniper attacks by the "Scorpio Killer", in the 1971 film Dirty Harry. The park and surrounding area are also featured in the 2000 film Bedazzled.

Many chapters in Richard Brautigan's 1967 novel Trout Fishing in America take place in Washington Square. It was also the setting for Lawrence Ferlinghetti's 1979 poem The Old Italians Dying.

== Gallery ==
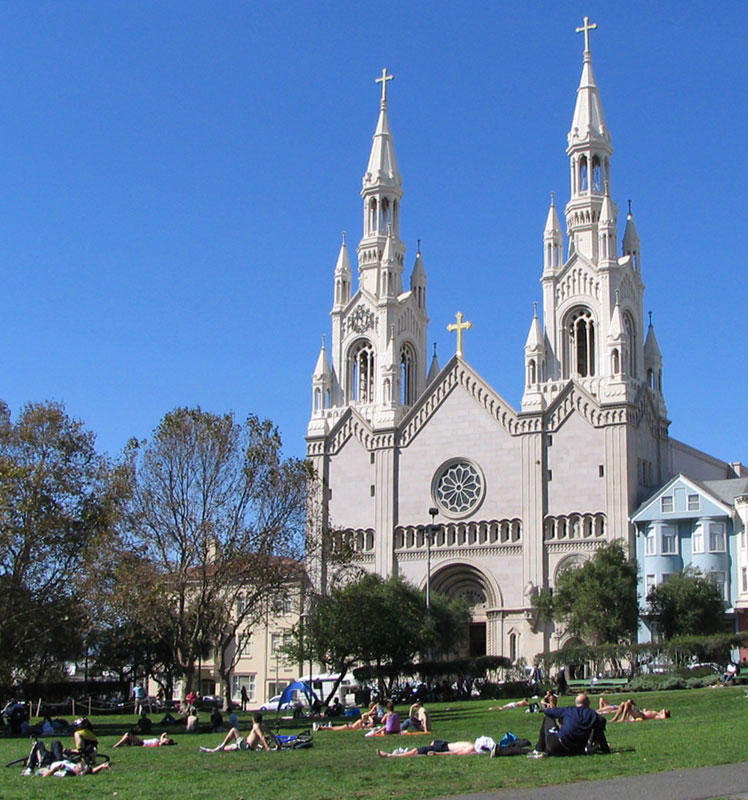
Saints Peter and Paul Church in Washington Square

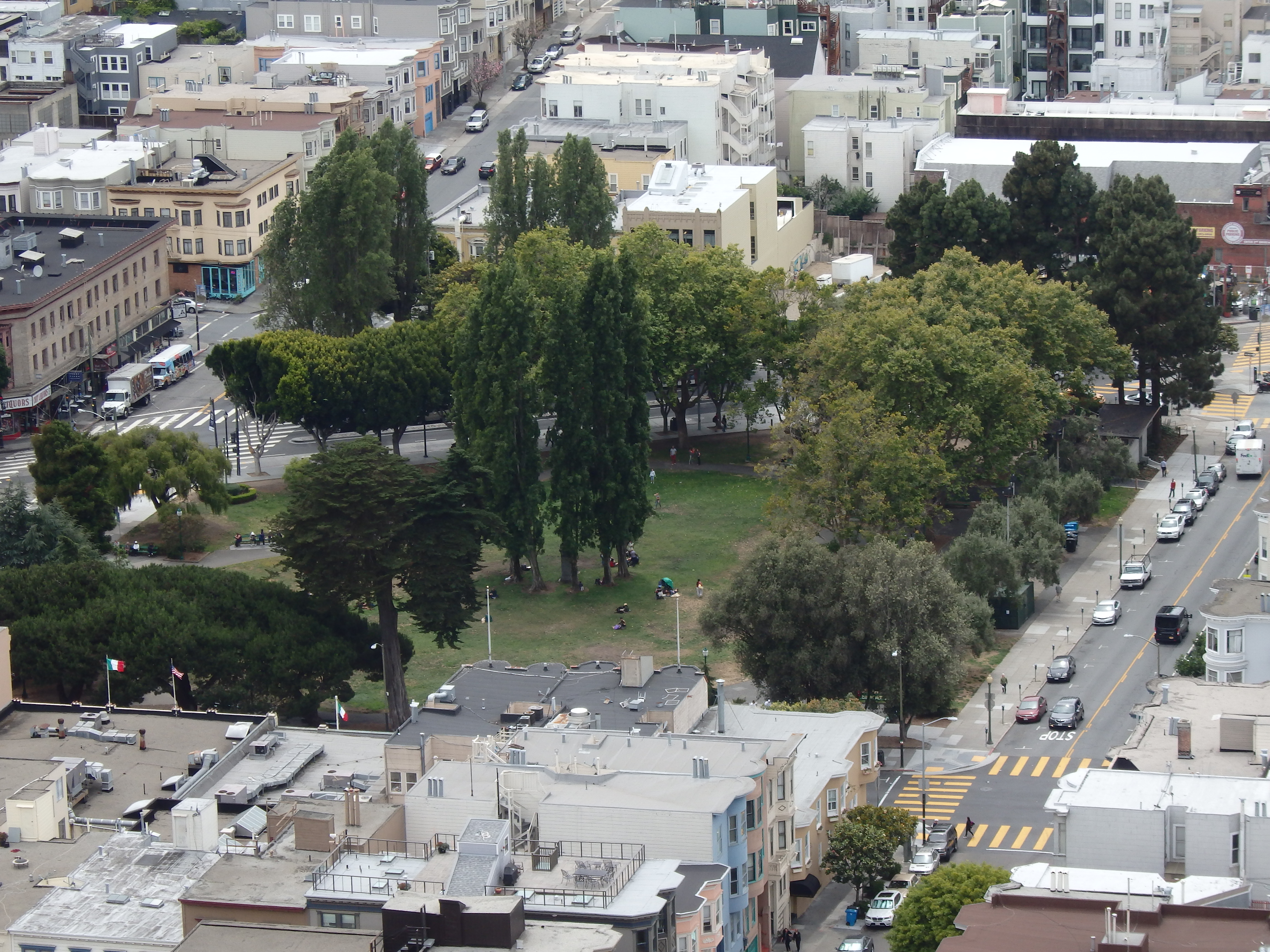
Aerial view of Washington Square

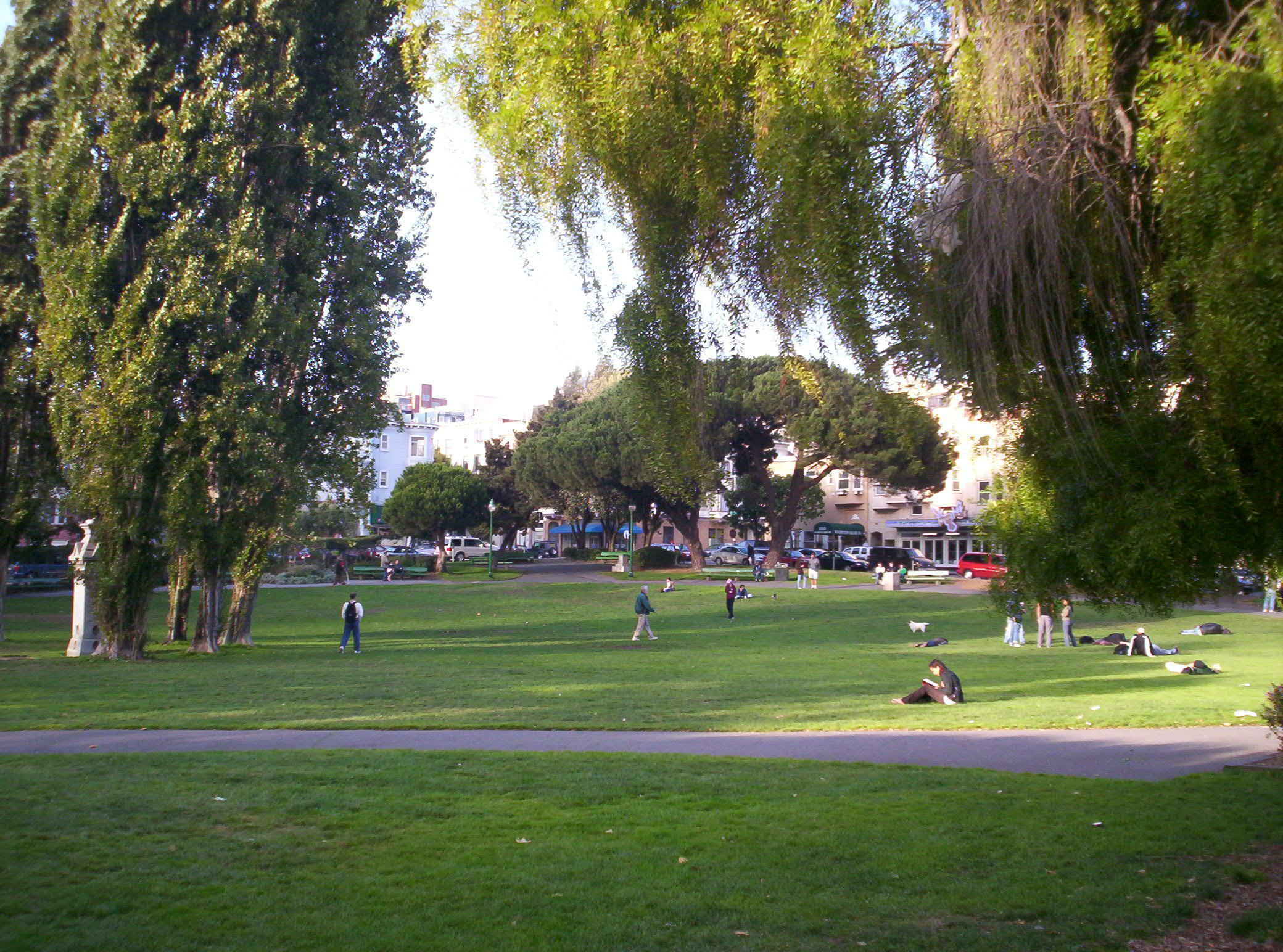
Washington Square Park (eastern side)

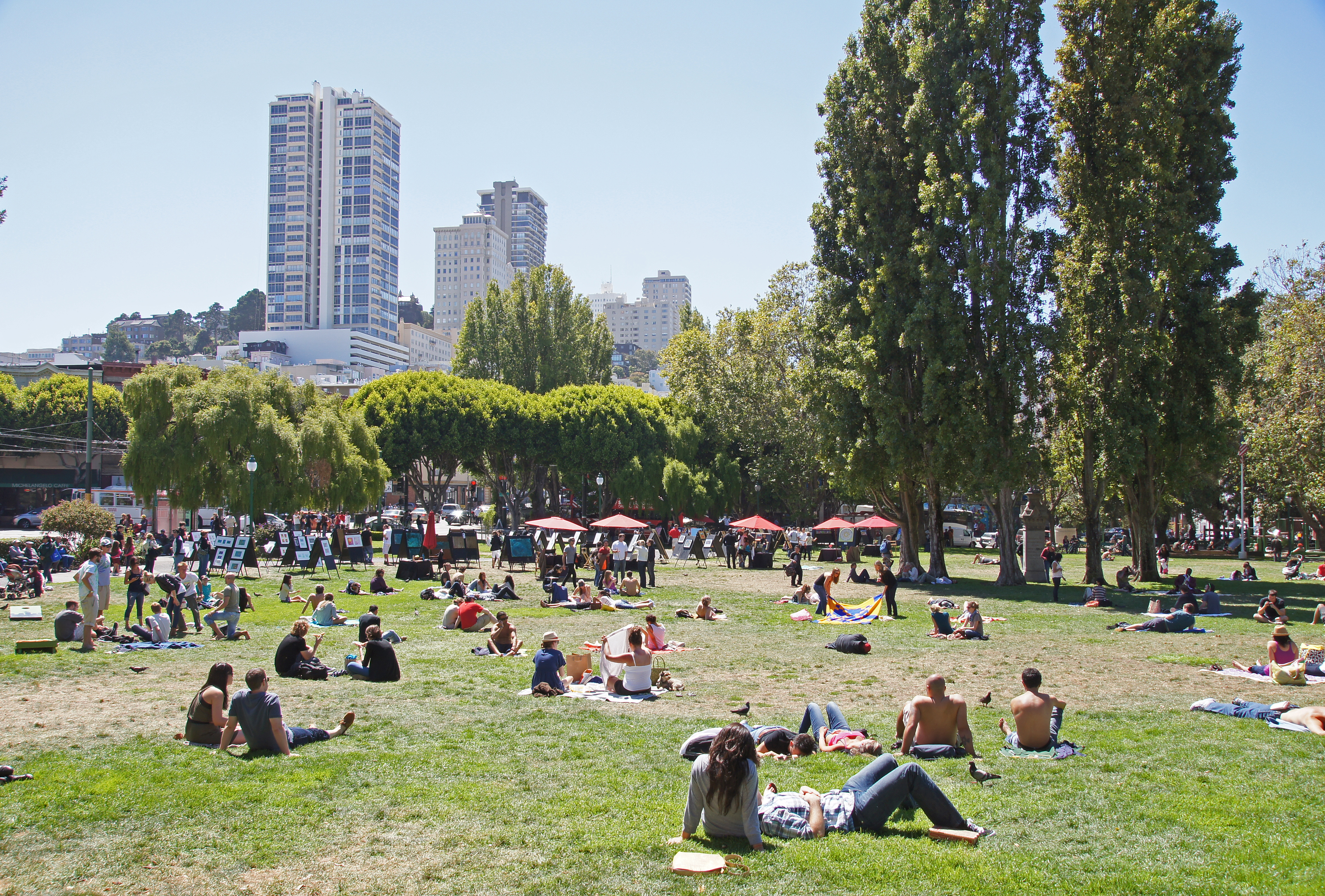
Washington Square (western side)

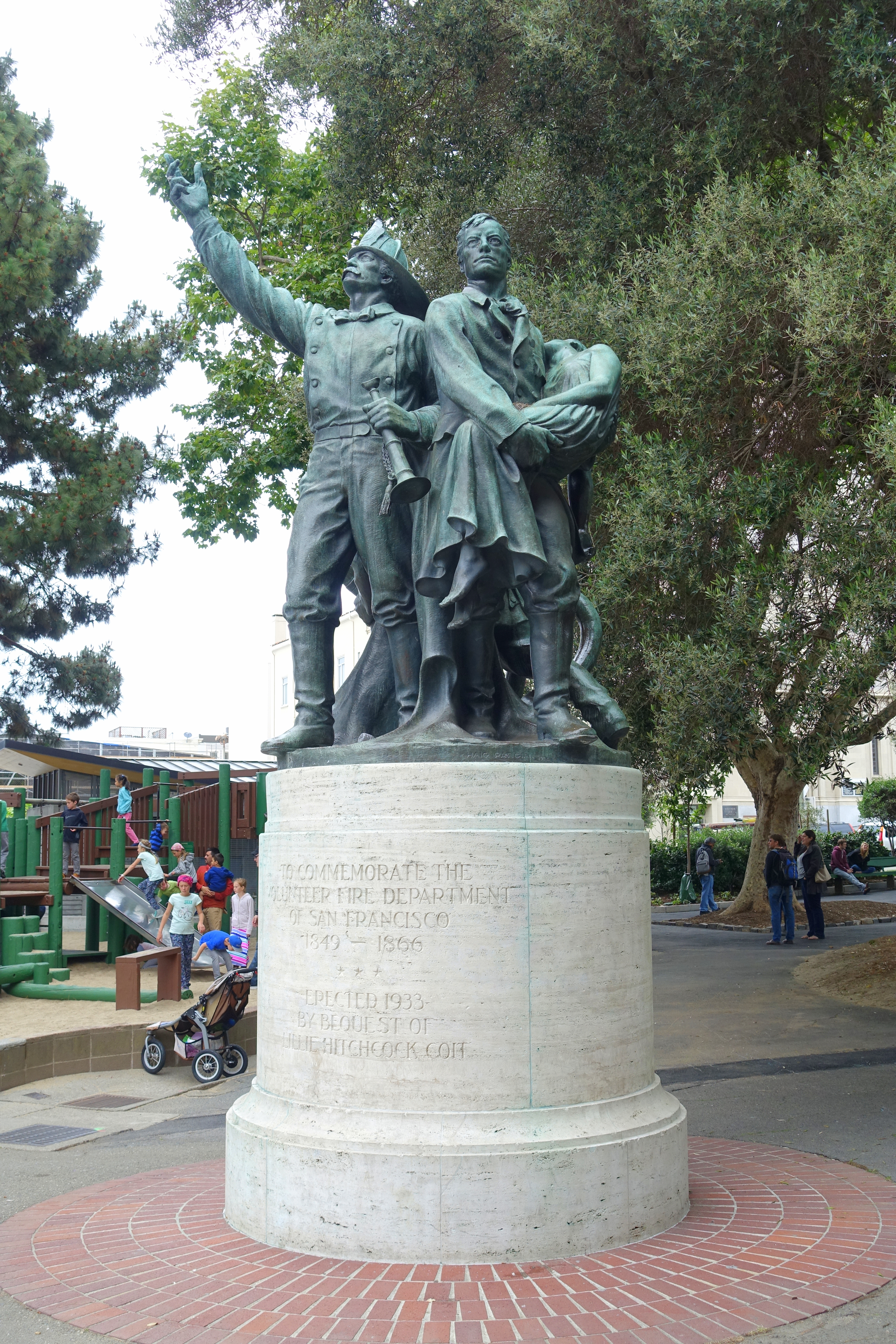
Volunteer Firemen Memorial by Haig Patigian

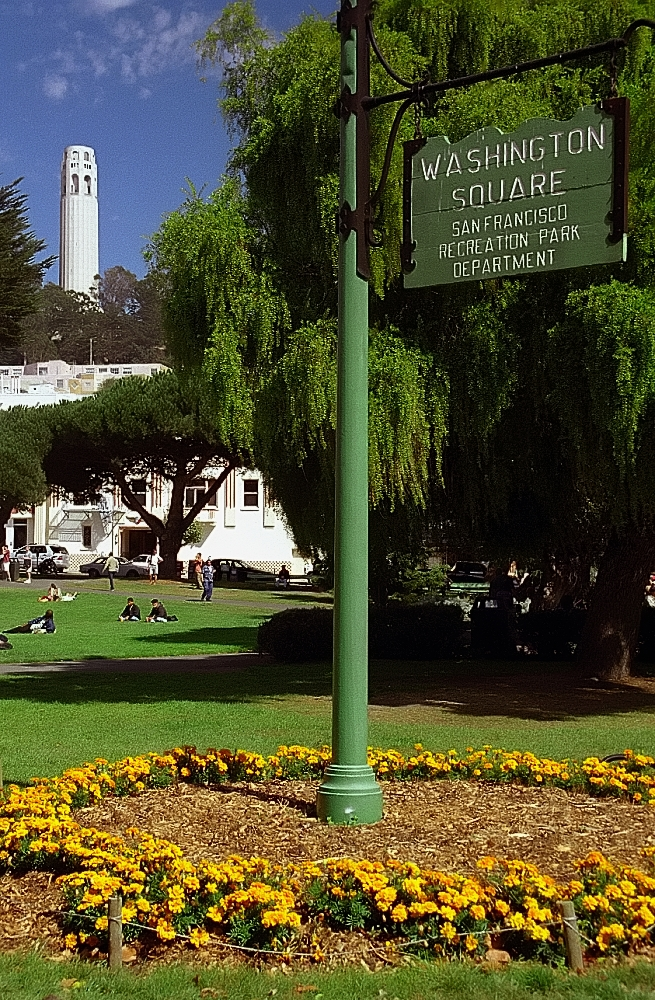
A sign in the park, with Coit Tower in the background

== See also ==
- Parks in San Francisco
- List of San Francisco Designated Landmarks
