= Saints Peter and Paul Church, San Francisco =

Catholic church in San Francisco, California

Saints Peter and Paul Church
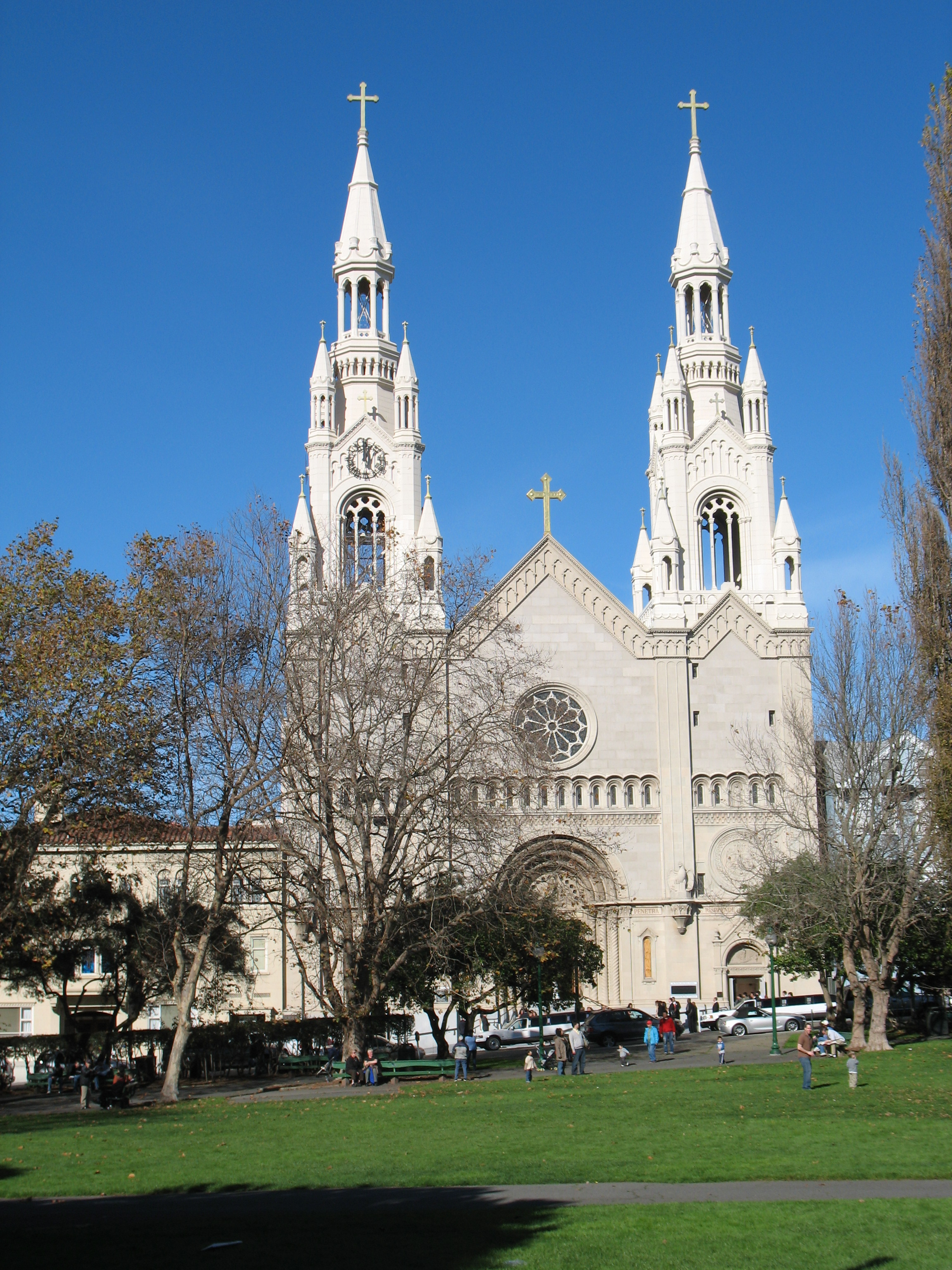
- Saints Peter and Paul Church

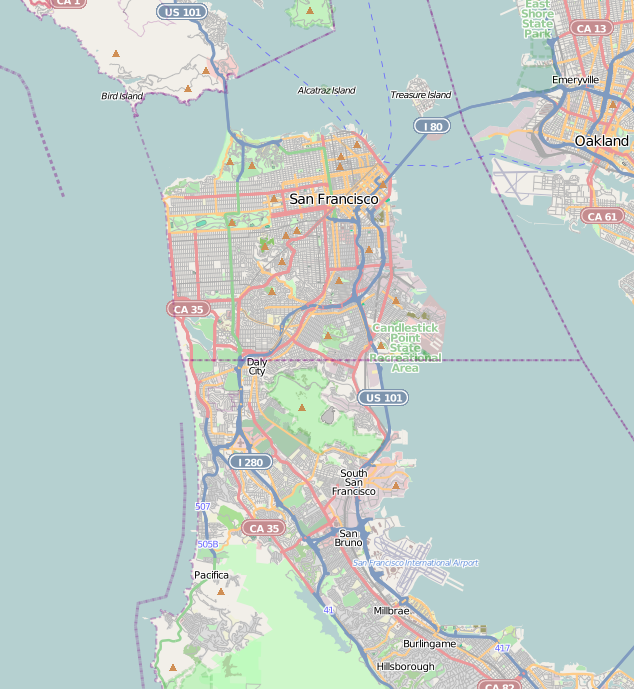
- Location of Saints Peter and Paul Church

Religion
- Affiliation: Catholic
- District: Archdiocese of San Francisco
- Province: Archdiocese of San Francisco
- Ecclesiastical or organizational status: Parish
- Leadership: Archbishop of San Francisco

Location
- Location: 666 Filbert Street; San Francisco
- Interactive map of Saints Peter and Paul Church
- Coordinates: 37°48′5.77″N 122°24′36.71″W

Architecture
- Completed: 1924
- Direction of façade: South

Saints Peter and Paul Church, San Francisco
- Traditional Chinese: 聖伯多祿聖保祿教堂
- Simplified Chinese: 圣伯多禄圣保禄教堂
Transcriptions
Standard Mandarin
- Hanyu Pinyin: Guānhuà Shèngbǎoluó Shèngbǐde Jiàotáng

Saints Peter and Paul Church (Italian: Ss. Pietro e Paolo, Chinese: 聖伯多禄圣保禄教堂) is a Catholic church in San Francisco's North Beach neighborhood. Located at 666 Filbert Street, it is directly across from Washington Square and is administered by the Salesians of Don Bosco. It is known as "la cattedrale italiana dell'Ovest", or the Italian Cathedral of the West (the use of the word "Cathedral" is merely colloquial, not an official designation), and has served as the home church and cultural center for San Francisco's Italian-American community since its consecration. It offers English, Italian, and Cantonese-language services.

== History ==
The first Saints Peter and Paul Church, built in 1884 on the corner of Filbert Street and Grant Avenue, was destroyed by the Great Quake of 1906. Construction on the current building was completed in 1924.

During 1926–27, the church was the target of radical anti-Catholic anarchists, who, in the name of propaganda of the deed, instituted five separate bombing attacks against the building in the space of one year. On March 6, 1927, officers of the San Francisco Police Department shot and killed one man and seriously wounded another, Celsten Eklund, a radical anarchist and local soapbox orator, as the two men attempted to light the fuse of a large dynamite bomb in front of the church. The dead man, known only as 'Ricca', was never fully identified; Eklund died of his wounds some time later without giving any information about his co-conspirators.

In recent years, Saints Peter and Paul has also become the home church for the city's Chinese-American Catholic population, offering weekly masses in Italian, Cantonese, and English.

Saints Peter and Paul serves the Archdiocese of San Francisco.

== In popular culture ==
Several scenes from Cecil B. DeMille's 1923 film The Ten Commandments were filmed at the Saints Peter and Paul Church while it was under construction. In 1955, the singer Marilyn Monroe and baseball player Joe DiMaggio posed for photographs on the steps of Saints Peter and Paul. The couple had been married elsewhere in the city earlier in the day in a civil ceremony.

Saints Peter and Paul Church is prominently featured in the 1971 film Dirty Harry, starring Clinton Eastwood as Dirty Harry. In the film, the church is the scene of a sniper attack by the "Scorpio Killer". Saints Peter and Paul also appears in the 1972 film What's Up, Doc? Judy Maxwell, portrayed by Barbra Streisand and Dr. Howard Bannister, portrayed by Ryan O'Neal, steal a Volkswagen Beetle from outside the church during a wedding ceremony. A second Dirty Harry film with Eastwood, the 1988 The Dead Pool, had scenes at the church. The protagonist of Wendell Berry's 1988 novella Remembering, Andy Catlett, stops outside Saints Peter and Paul. He reads the Italian inscription over its portal: the opening lines of Dante's Paradiso.

Parts of the 1993 film Sister Act 2: Back in the Habit, starring Whoopi Goldberg, were also filmed at Saints Peter and Paul. Both the exterior and the interior of the church were prominently featured in the 1994 movie Getting Even with Dad, starring Macaulay Culkin. Joe DiMaggio's funeral was held at the church on March 11, 1999.

In 2010, the singer Michelle Lambert, then a college student and a former parishioner at Saints Peter and Paul, portrayed Mary in the “Las Posadas de San Francisco,” parade that was sponsored by the church. In the 2015 film San Andreas, starring Dwayne Johnson, the church and Washington Square are seen being hit by a tsunami as it reaches the North Beach neighborhood..
