= North Beach, San Francisco =

North Beach
- Neighborhood
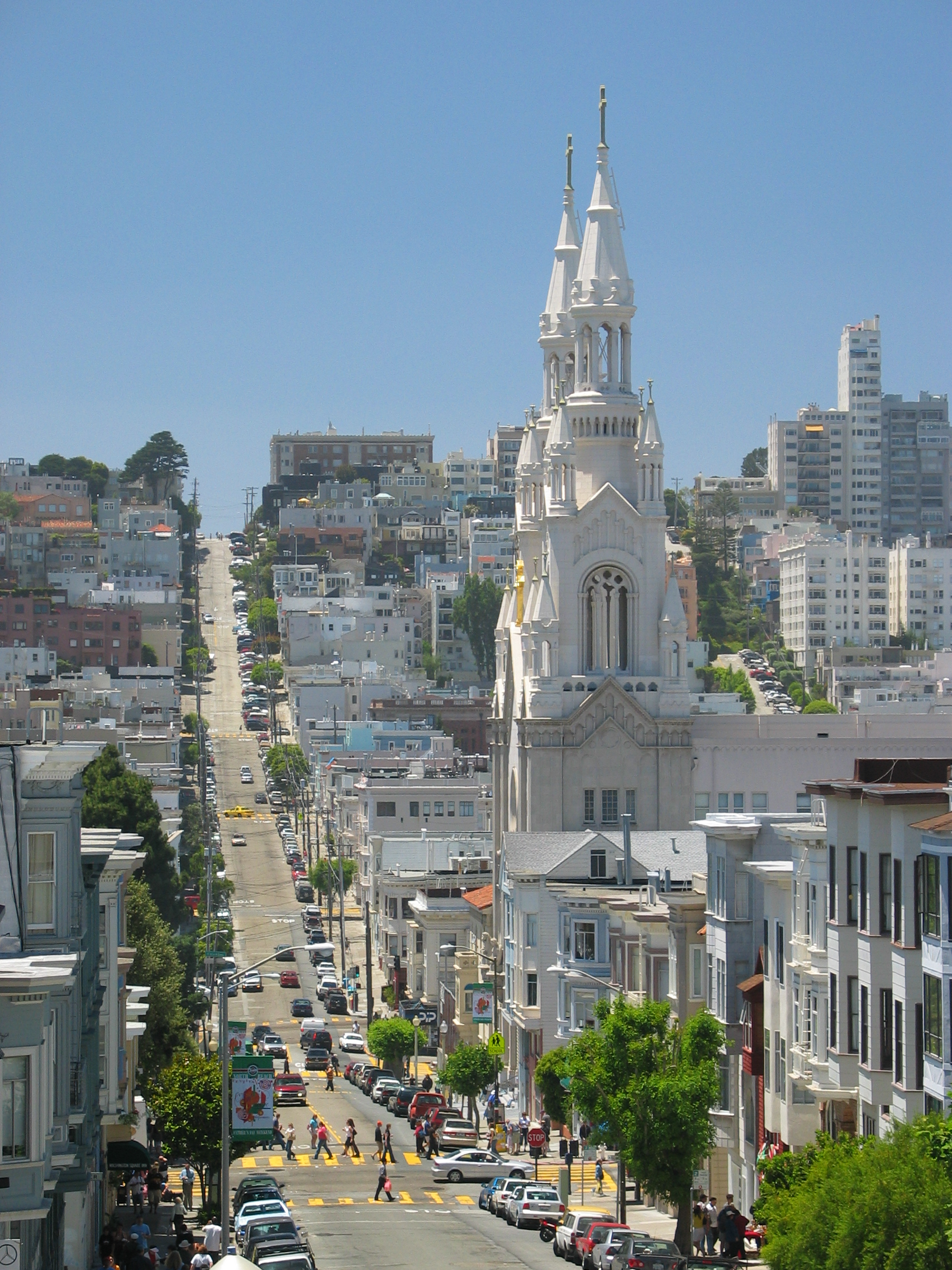
- Saints Peter and Paul Church in North Beach.

- Location within Central San Francisco
- Coordinates: 37°48′1.04″N 122°24′36.66″W
- Country: United States
- State: California
- City and county: San Francisco

Government
  - Supervisor: Danny Sauter
  - Assemblymember: Matt Haney (D)
  - State Senator: Scott Wiener (D)
  - U. S. Rep.: Nancy Pelosi (D)

Area
  - Total: 0.492 sq mi (1.27 km^{2})
- Elevation: 16 ft (5 m)

Population
  - Total: 18,915
  - Density: 38,400/sq mi (14,800/km^{2})
- Time zone: UTC-8 (Pacific)
  - Summer (DST): UTC-7 (PDT)
- ZIP Codes: 94111, 94133
- Area codes: 415/628
- GNIS feature ID: 1659245

North Beach is a neighborhood in the northeast of San Francisco adjacent to Chinatown, the Financial District, and Russian Hill. The neighborhood is San Francisco's "Little Italy" and has historically been home to a large Italian American population, largely from Northern Italy. It still has many Italian restaurants and a sizeable Italian community, though many other ethnic groups currently live in the neighborhood. It was also the historic center of the beatnik subculture and has become one of San Francisco's main nightlife districts as well as a residential neighborhood populated by a mix of young urban professionals, families, and Chinese immigrants.

The American Planning Association (APA) has named North Beach as one of ten "Great Neighborhoods in America".

== Location ==
North Beach is bounded by the former Barbary Coast, now Jackson Square, the Financial District south of Broadway, Chinatown to the southwest of Columbus below Green Street, Russian Hill to the west, Telegraph Hill to the east and Fisherman's Wharf at Bay Street to the north.

Main intersections are Union and Columbus, the southwest corner of Washington Square, Grant Avenue, and Vallejo Street.

The neighborhood consists of modern, mid-century apartments, duplexes, and Victorian homes and multiplexes.

== History ==
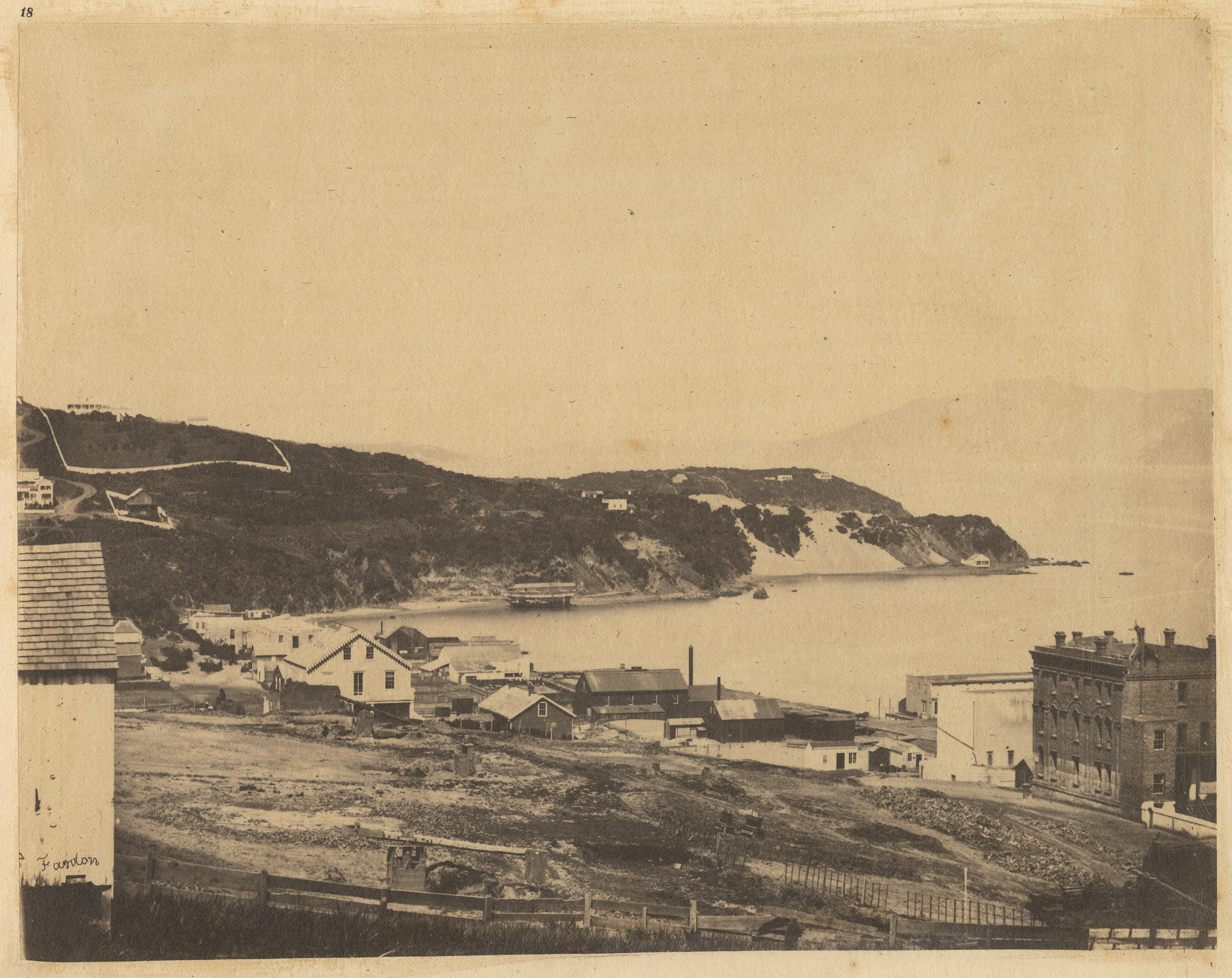
View of North Beach from Telegraph Hill, 1856

Originally, the city's northeast shoreline extended only to what is today Taylor and Francisco streets. The area largely known today as North Beach was an actual beach, filled in with land fill around the late 19th century. Warehouses, fishing wharves, and docks were then built on the newly formed shoreline. Due to the proximity of the docks, the southern half of the neighborhood south of Broadway was home of the infamous Barbary Coast.

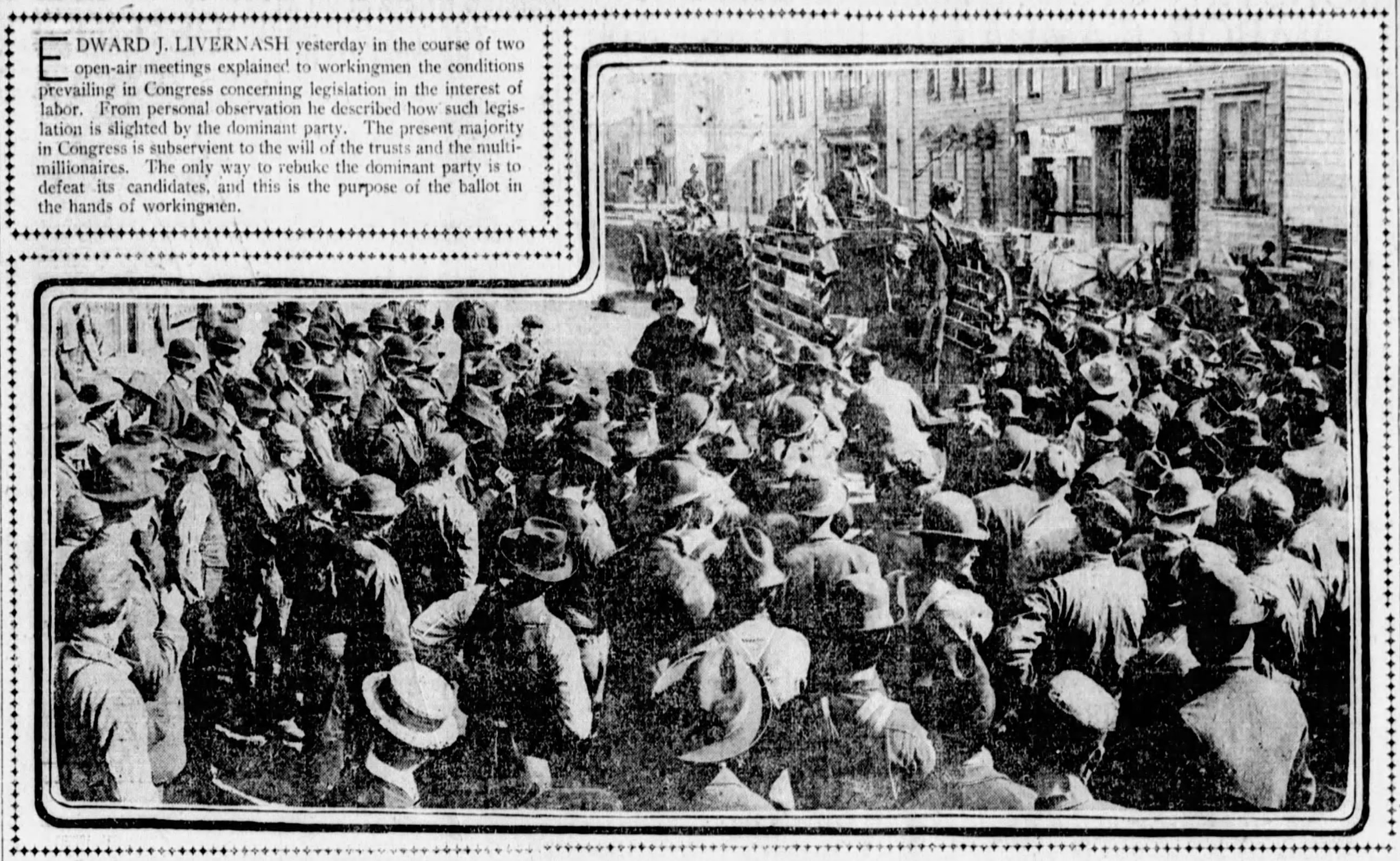
Congressional candidate Edward J. Livernash addresses a meeting of workers at the wire works at North Beach, November 1, 1902

In 1890, Elizabeth Ashe and Alice Griffith founded a settlement house that would become the Telegraph Hill Neighborhood Center to help fight illness, illiteracy and poor conditions in North Beach and lobbied hard for better recreation opportunities for neighborhood children. In 1907, the city formed its first playground commission with the idea of carving out space for recreation areas specifically for kids. The first playground commission picked two sites, including the North Beach Playground. The plan included an outdoor swimming pool, which was financed by diverting funds from a fire department cistern planned for Powell and Lombard, perhaps the first publicly financed public pool in the city. In 1910, the North Beach playground and pool was constructed. The three youngest of the nine DiMaggio kids, Vince, Joe and Dom, grew up playing baseball there in the 1920s and became professional baseball players.

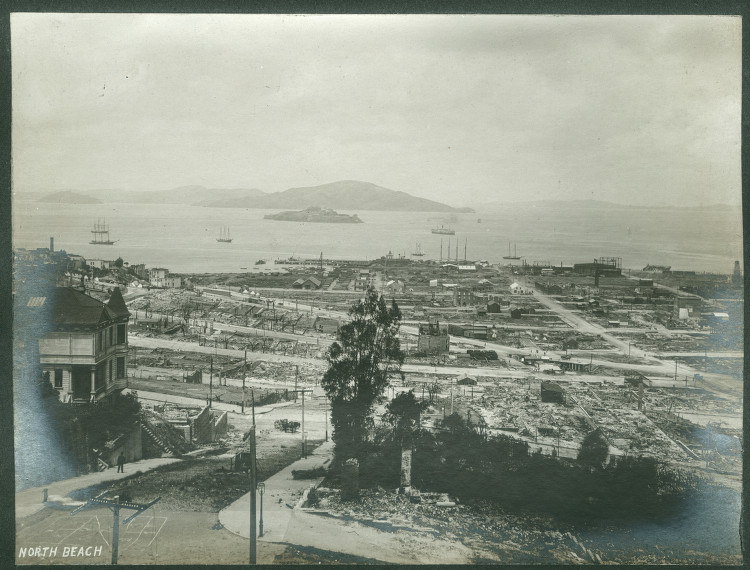
North Beach after the 1906 earthquake

After the 1906 earthquake reconstruction, a large number of Italian immigrants created the Italian character of the neighborhood that still exists. Prominent Italian Americans that came from the neighborhood include baseball legend Joe DiMaggio who grew up in the neighborhood and briefly returned to live there with his wife Marilyn Monroe during the 1950s, as well as former San Francisco mayor and politician Joseph Alioto plus others from the prominent Alioto family.

North Beach was home to the first lesbian bar in San Francisco, Mona's 440 Club. Mona Sargeant and her husband Jimmie opened Mona's in 1936 in a North Beach basement as a small underground bar celebrating the end of Prohibition. Once Mona's gained enough popularity between the gay community and tourists, the club moved to a much larger location at 440 Broadway Street. The club remained Mona's 440 until the mid-1950s.

After World War II, and accelerated during the Korean War, the Italian American population has been moving out of the Little Italy sections of North Beach, Telegraph Hill, and Fisherman's Wharf due to suburbanization.

During the 1950s, many of the neighborhood's cafes and bars became the home and epicenter of the Beat Generation and gave rise to the San Francisco Renaissance. The term "beatnik" originated from the scene here and was coined in a derogatory fashion by famed San Francisco Chronicle columnist Herb Caen. Many of that generation's most famous writers and personalities such as Jack Kerouac, Allen Ginsberg, Gregory Corso, Neal Cassady lived in the neighborhood. Another poet from this generation, Lawrence Ferlinghetti, founded the City Lights Bookstore on the corner of Broadway and Columbus that served as one of the main focal points of this generation. The location became a historical landmark in 2001.

During the 1960s a notable night spot was The Committee, an improvisational theater group founded by alumni of The Second City in Chicago. The Committee opened April 10, 1963, at 622 Broadway in a 300-seat cabaret theater.

Broadway strip clubs descended from the venues of Sydney Town, Barbary Coast, Terrific Street, and the International Settlement. The Condor Club, on the corner of Columbus and Broadway, was opened in 1964 as America's first topless bar, which it is again today. The Lusty Lady was the first striptease club to become a worker cooperative, managed by the dancers who worked at that peep-show establishment.

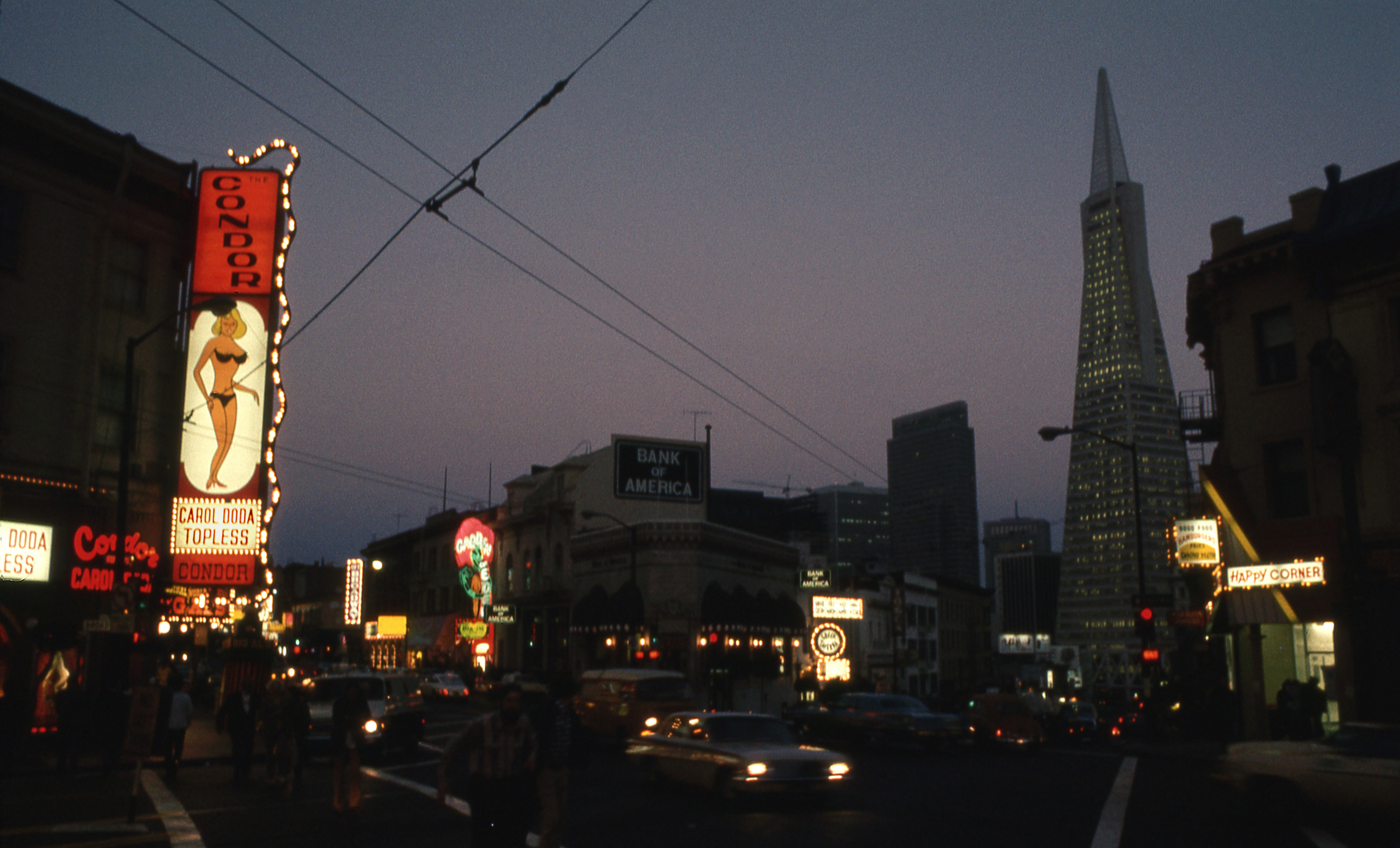
1973

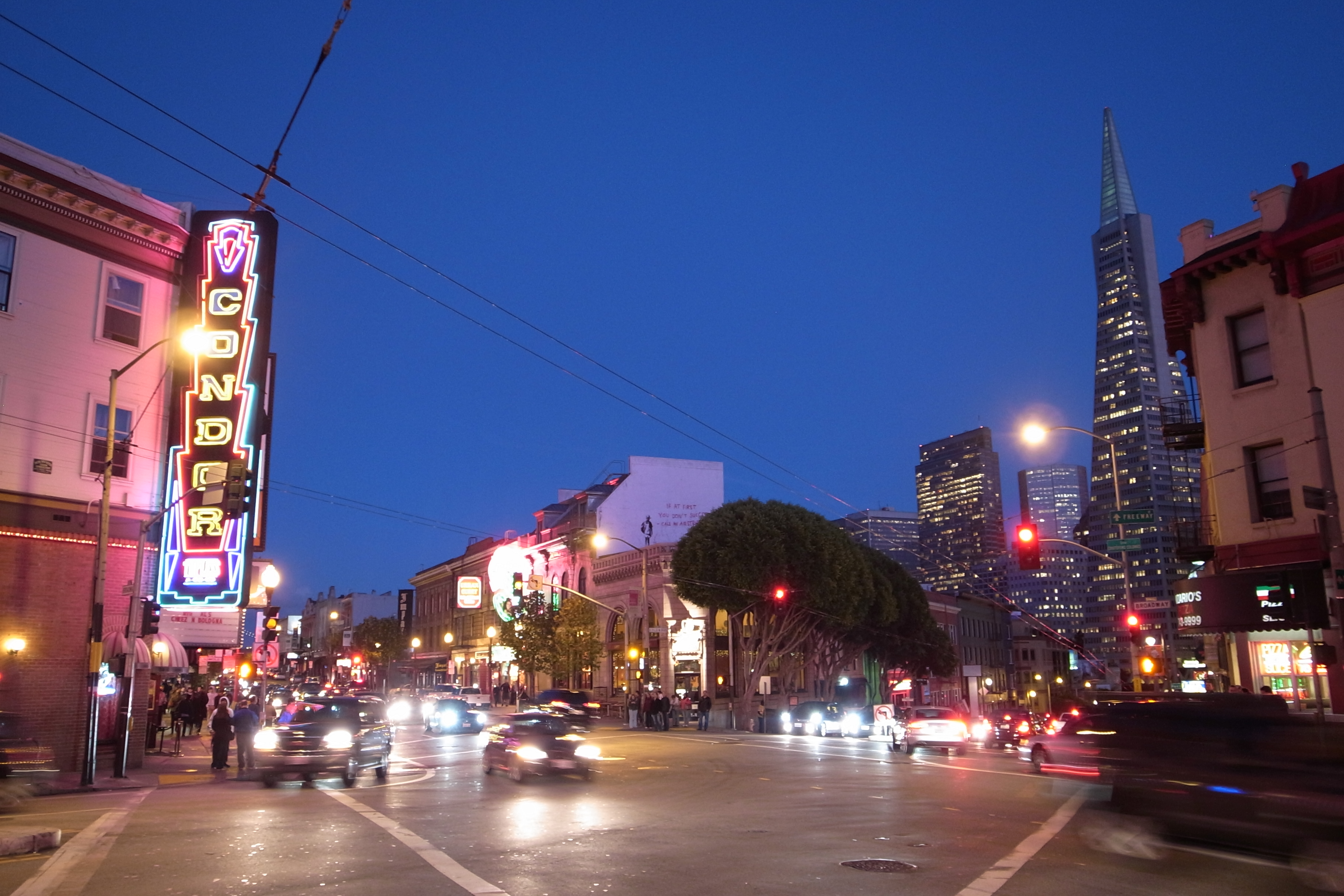
2012

Carol Doda's Condor Club at Columbus and Broadway

In the 1970s and 1980s Broadway was the location of many live music clubs, like the Stone, and a punk rock club called Mabuhay Gardens.

Since the 1980s, and much like Manhattan's Little Italy, due to a decrease in emigration from Italy and gentrification, the neighborhood has seen its native Italian American population rapidly shrink. The neighborhood has since seen neighboring Chinatown expanding north into the neighborhood south of Broadway and along Stockton Street, causing a major demographic shift to a mix of mostly Chinese and young professional population, with few Italian Americans remaining.

In 2000 after some negotiations, the heirs of Joe DiMaggio's estate, two granddaughters and their four children, welcomed the renaming of North Beach playground as the Joe DiMaggio North Beach Playground. In 2015, the first renovation of the playground in more than 50 years was completed.

Paul Kantner of the Jefferson Airplane was living in North Beach in an apartment unit above Al's Attire at the corner of Grant Avenue and Vallejo Street at the time of his death in 2016, and was often a patron of nearby Caffe Trieste.

== Attractions and characteristics ==
=== Events ===
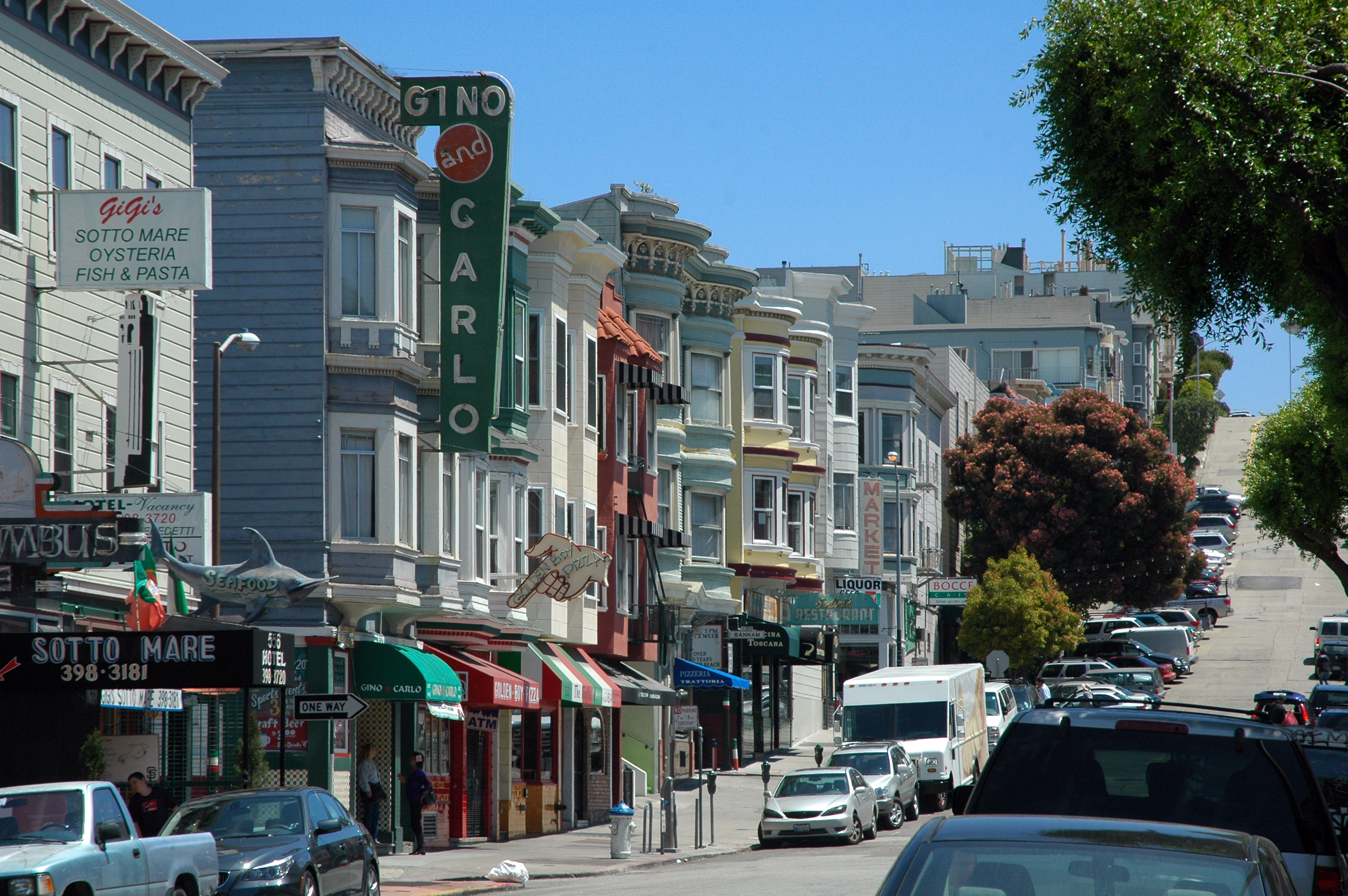
Italian shops and restaurants on Green Street.

- The North Beach Festival street fair on Grant Avenue and Columbus Avenue usually held on Father's Day weekend in June is one of the city's largest. It is also considered one of the nation's oldest street fairs.
- The Italian Heritage Parade, formerly known as the Columbus Day Parade, is the United States' longest continuously run Italian heritage celebration. The route goes from Fisherman's Wharf, San Francisco, along Columbus Avenue, to Washington Square, in front of Saints Peter and Paul Church, San Francisco. The event celebrated its 150th anniversary in 2018.

=== Population ===
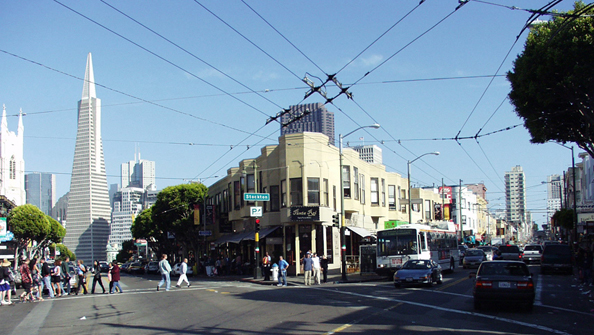
Looking southeast from Columbus Avenue (on the left) and Stockton (on the right). The Transamerica Pyramid is visible in the background on Columbus Avenue. The array of overhead wires supply power for the electric trolley buses such as the one seen on Stockton Street.

The neighborhood still retains an Italian character with many Italian restaurants, cafes, and bakeries that line Columbus Avenue and Washington Square.

=== Religious institutions and sites ===
- The National Shrine of Saint Francis of Assisi, the city's namesake, is located on Vallejo Street.
- Known as "The Italian Cathedral of the West", Saints Peter and Paul Church is located on the north side of Filbert Street in front of Washington Square. Joe DiMaggio married his first wife there, and came for photos after his marriage to Marilyn Monroe. Saints Peter and Paul is considered a San Francisco landmark and an emblematic tie to the neighborhood's Italian American past.

=== Secular institutions and sites ===
- An alleyway between Columbus and Grant Avenues is named for Beat Generation writer Jack Kerouac, who once lived there and frequented the famous City Lights Bookstore on the corner of Columbus and Broadway as well as the numerous nearby bars and coffee shops.
- Broadway east of Columbus Avenue still serves as one of the city's main nightclub districts and offers restaurants, blues clubs, strip clubs, nightclubs, and jazz clubs.

== Education ==
It is in the San Francisco Unified School District (SFUSD) and is within the John Yehall Chin Elementary School (余河小學) attendance area. Chin has a Cantonese language program.

The Academy of Art University has at least one building in the area, across the street from Pier 39.

Prior to its 2022 closure, the San Francisco Art Institute was located in the northern end of North Beach, on Russian Hill.

== Notable residents ==
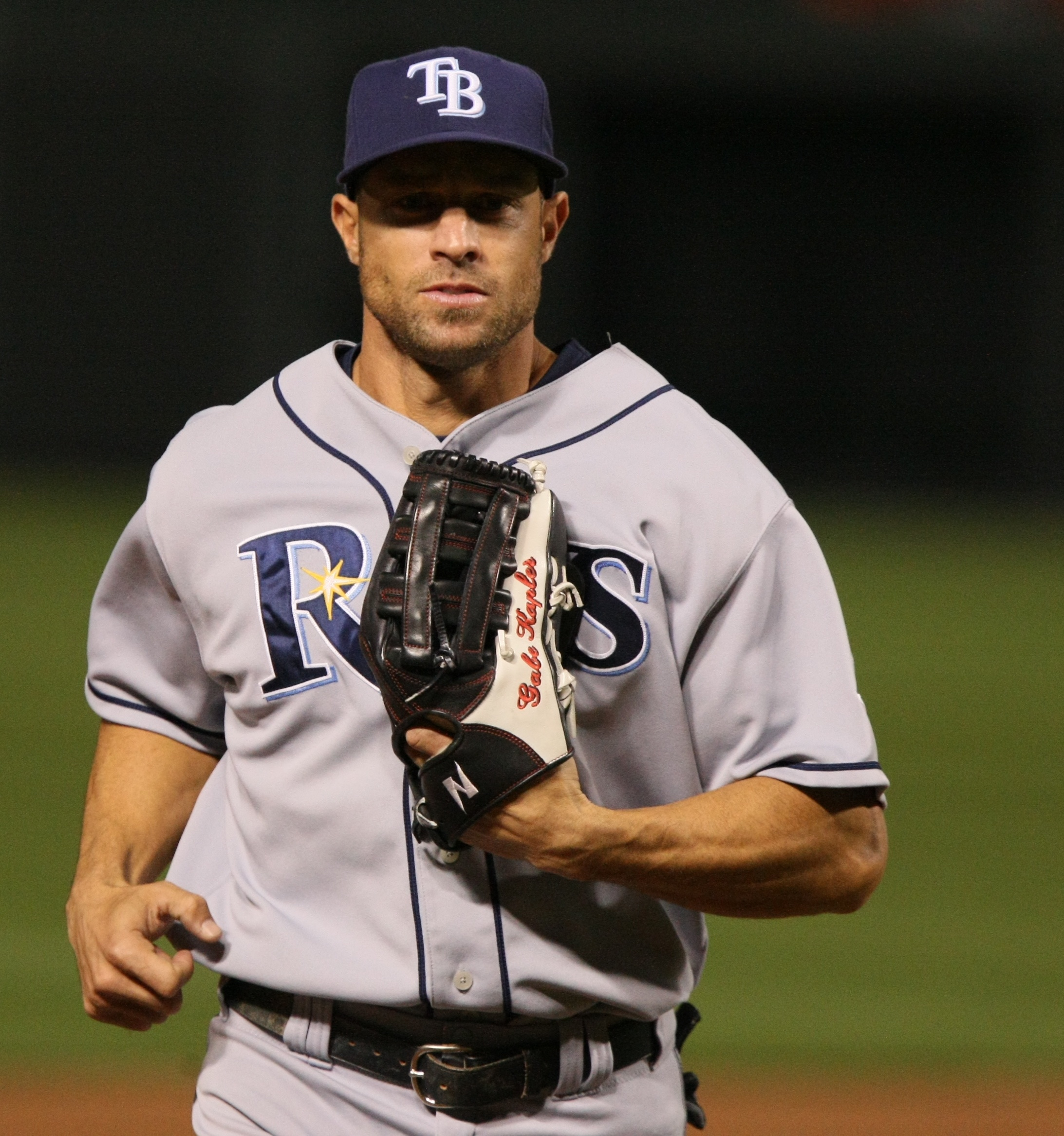
Gabe Kapler

- Frankie Crosetti (1910–2002), Major League Baseball shortstop
- Joe DiMaggio (1914–1999), Hall of Fame Major League Baseball center fielder
- Lawrence Ferlinghetti (1919–2021), poet and painter
- Allen Ginsberg (1926–1997), poet and writer
- Jack Hirschman (1933–2021), poet and social activist
- Gabe Kapler (born 1975), Major League Baseball outfielder, former manager of the San Francisco Giants, and 2021 NL Manager of the Year
- Bob Kaufman (1925–1986), Beat poet and surrealist, jazz performance artist, and satirist
- B. Kliban (1935–1990), cartoonist
- Peter Macchiarini (1909–2001), Modernist jeweler and sculptor
- Marino Pieretti (1920–1981), MLB baseball player
- Jack Sarfatti (born 1939) Featured in Herbert Gold's "Bohemia" and David Kaiser's How the Hippies Saved Physics, inspiration for Emmett Brown in "Back to The Future" Physicist working on time travel.
- A. D. Winans (born 1936), poet, essayist, short story writer, and publisher

== See also ==
- 49-Mile Scenic Drive
- The Saloon
- San Francisco crime family
- Vesuvio Cafe
- Old Spaghetti Factory Cafe
