= Last Chance =

Last Chance may refer to:

== Film ==
- The Last Chance (1926 film), an American silent western film directed by Horace B. Carpenter
- The Last Chance (1937 film), a British drama directed by Thomas Bentley
- The Last Chance (1945 film), a Swiss war film directed by Leopold Lindtberg
- The Last Chance (1968 film), an Italian spy film starring Tab Hunter
- Last Chance (1973 film) or Stateline Motel, an Italian crime film directed by Maurizio Lucidi
- Last Chance, a 1999 drama directed by Bryan Cranston
- Last Chance (2012 film), a Canadian documentary
- The Last Chance: Diary of Comedians or Bokutachi no Koukan Nikki, a 2014 Japanese film directed by Teruyoshi Uchimura
- Last Chance (2016 film), an Australian drama short film

== Music ==
- "Last Chance" (song), by Ginuwine, 2009
- "Last Chance", a song by Allure from Allure
- "Last Chance", a song by China Drum from Goosefair
- "Last Chance", a song by Kaskade from Atmosphere
- "Last Chance", a song by Kylie Minogue from Disco
- "Last Chance", a song by Level 42 from The Pursuit of Accidents
- "Last Chance", a song by Maroon 5 from Hands All Over
- "Last Chance", a song by Moke from Shorland
- "Last Chance", a song by Nicki Minaj from Pink Friday
- "Last Chance", a song by Night Ranger from Feeding off the Mojo
- "Last Chance", a song by Shooting Star from Shooting Star

== Places ==
- Last Chance, California
- Last Chance, Colorado
- Last Chance, Idaho
- Last Chance, Iowa
- Last Chance, North Carolina
- Last Chance, Oklahoma
- Last Chance Creek (disambiguation)
- Last Chance Range, California
- Last Chance Range (Nevada)
- Last Chance Saloon, a popular name for bars near the border of an area where alcoholic beverages are scarce

== Other uses ==
- Last Chance (Mars), a rock outcrop on the planet Mars
- Last Chance (fireboat), built by MetalCraft Marine, for Clayton, NY
- "Last Chance" (Doctors), a 2004 television episode

== See also ==
- Last Chance, No Breaks, an album by Jamal Phillips
- Last Chance U, an American documentary television series
- The Last Chancers, a 2002 British sitcom
- Last clear chance, a legal doctrine
- One Last Chance (disambiguation)
- Operation Last Chance
