= One Last Chance =

One Last Chance may refer to:

- One Last Chance, a 1990 installment of the British anthology TV series Screen One
- One Last Chance, a 2004 film featuring Iain Robertson
- "One Last Chance", a 2009 song by Daughtry from Leave This Town
- "One Last Chance", a 2007 song by James Morrison from Undiscovered

== See also ==
- Last Chance (disambiguation)
- One More Chance (disambiguation)
