= Another Chance =

Another Chance may refer to:

- "Another Chance" (Roger Sanchez song), 2001
- "Another Chance" (Hikaru Utada song), 1999
- "Another Chance" (Tammy Wynette song), 1982
- Another Chance (film), a 1989 film

== See also ==
- One More Chance (disambiguation)
