= OnePath Network =

Australian Islamic media outlet

- Country: Australia
- Broadcast area: Worldwide
- Headquarters: Sydney, Australia

Programming
- Languages: English, Arabic

Ownership
- Key people: Malaz Majanni; Kamal Saleh

History
- Launched: 2014

Links
- Website: onepathnetwork.com

OnePath Network is an Australian Islamic-themed original content video production studio and media outlet based in Sydney, Australia. It was established in 2014 as a not-for-profit organization and da‘wah media network. It publishes videos, articles, news, and interviews, and produced the short film Last Chance.

== History ==
OnePath network was founded in March 2014 in Sydney as a non-profit by Malaz Majanni as a da‘wah initiative; the goal was to create "values based" video content to counter negative views of Islam and Muslims and to generate news, documentaries, and commentary from a Muslim perspective. The network was started with $1M in donations from the Muslim community, and sought to grow by selling advertising aimed at young Muslims. It aimed to distribute its content through its website and apps, YouTube, Facebook, and occasionally in other outlets like movie theaters. The project was endorsed by Ibrahim Abu Mohamed, the Grand Mufti of Australia, and in April 2015 Irfan Yusuf endorsed the network in an editorial published in the Sydney Morning Herald.

Guests have included Brian McDonald, the head of the AFP counterterrorism team, and in 2016 they interviewed Oliver Bridgeman, who alleged that he had been trapped in Syria after the Australian Government cancelled his passport.

In October 2016 the OnePath Network produced Last Chance, a 45-minute film about a young Muslim man tempted into a life of selling drugs and violence, which was shown in movie theaters in Australia. By February 2018 the network had made and released around 400 videos.

== Awards ==
At the 2016 Australian Muslim Achievement Awards, OnePath Network won Media Organisation of the Year, and one of its hosts was a finalist for Role Model of the Year. The following year, in 2017, the network won the award in the "media" category of Dubai's Islamic Economy Awards.

In 2023, OnePath Network was awarded YouTube's 1 Million subscriber creator award.
