= Moke (Dutch band) =

Dutch indie rock band

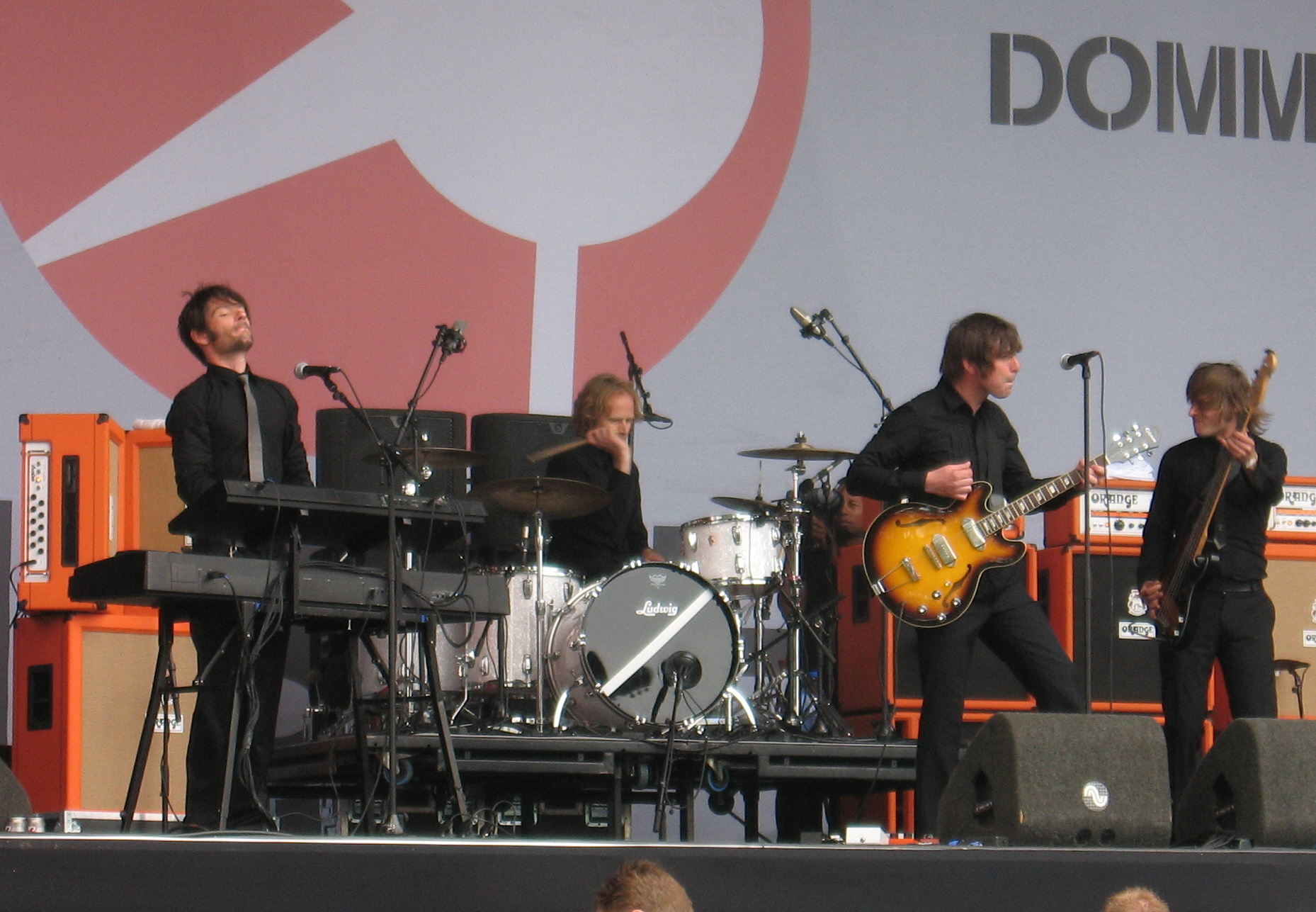
- Moke at Parkpop 2008

Background information
- Origin: Amsterdam, Netherlands
- Genres: Indie rock
- Years active: 2005–present
- Labels: Play It Again Sam
- Members: Felix Maginn; Marcin Felis; Rob Klerkx; Eddy Steeneken
- Past members: Phil Tilli
- Website: www.mokemusic.com

Moke is a Dutch band from Amsterdam, which was founded in 2005. They published their debut album Shorland in 2007. The band is most popular in the Netherlands, where they became commonly known after a performance in the daily television show 'De Wereld Draait Door'. Their single "This Plan" is used by Toyota in the commercial for the Yaris. They performed at several festivals, like London Calling, Lowlands and Pinkpop. They also were the supporting act of Paul Weller, Keane, Razorlight and Amy MacDonald.

In 2008, they played the Pinkpop festival, opening the main stage on the main day. The band also toured with Paul Weller on all the dates of his European tour in October 2008. Moke released their second album "The Long & Dangerous Sea" in 2009's autumn. They toured along several venues, and they were the dayopener of the second day of Pinkpop 2010. They did this together with the Metropole Orchestra, and together with the Metropole Orchestra they held a great gig at the Heineken Music Hall, Amsterdam on 9 October 2010.

== Biography ==
Singer Felix Maginn played in the band Supersub before forming Moke. Together with Tröckener Kecks guitarist Phil Tilli and Supersub drummer Rob Klerckx they start Moke, and bass player Marcin Felis and keyboard player Eddy Steeneken are added, and the line-up was completed.

During the recordings for debut album Shorland they meet British star Paul Weller, who was in Amsterdam for recording his new album at that time. Moke's producer, Joeri Saal, is also the producer of Weller's album As Is Now. Weller was impressed by Moke's debut album, and he invited them to be his support act for two of his shows at The Forum, London.

== Discography ==
=== Albums ===
- Shorland (2007)
- The Long & Dangerous Sea (2009)
- Till death do us part theatre tour (2011)
- Collider (2012)
- The Time Has Come (2015)

=== Singles ===
- "Last Chance" (2007)
- "Here Comes The Summer" (2007)
- "This Plan" (2007)
- "Heart Without A Home" (2008)
- "We'll Dance" (Remix) – Moke vs Don Diablo (2008)
- "The Long Way" (2008)
- "Switch" (2009)
- "Love My Life" (2009)
- "Let It Burn" (2015)
