= Heinold's First and Last Chance Saloon =

- U.S. National Register of Historic Places
- Oakland Designated Landmark
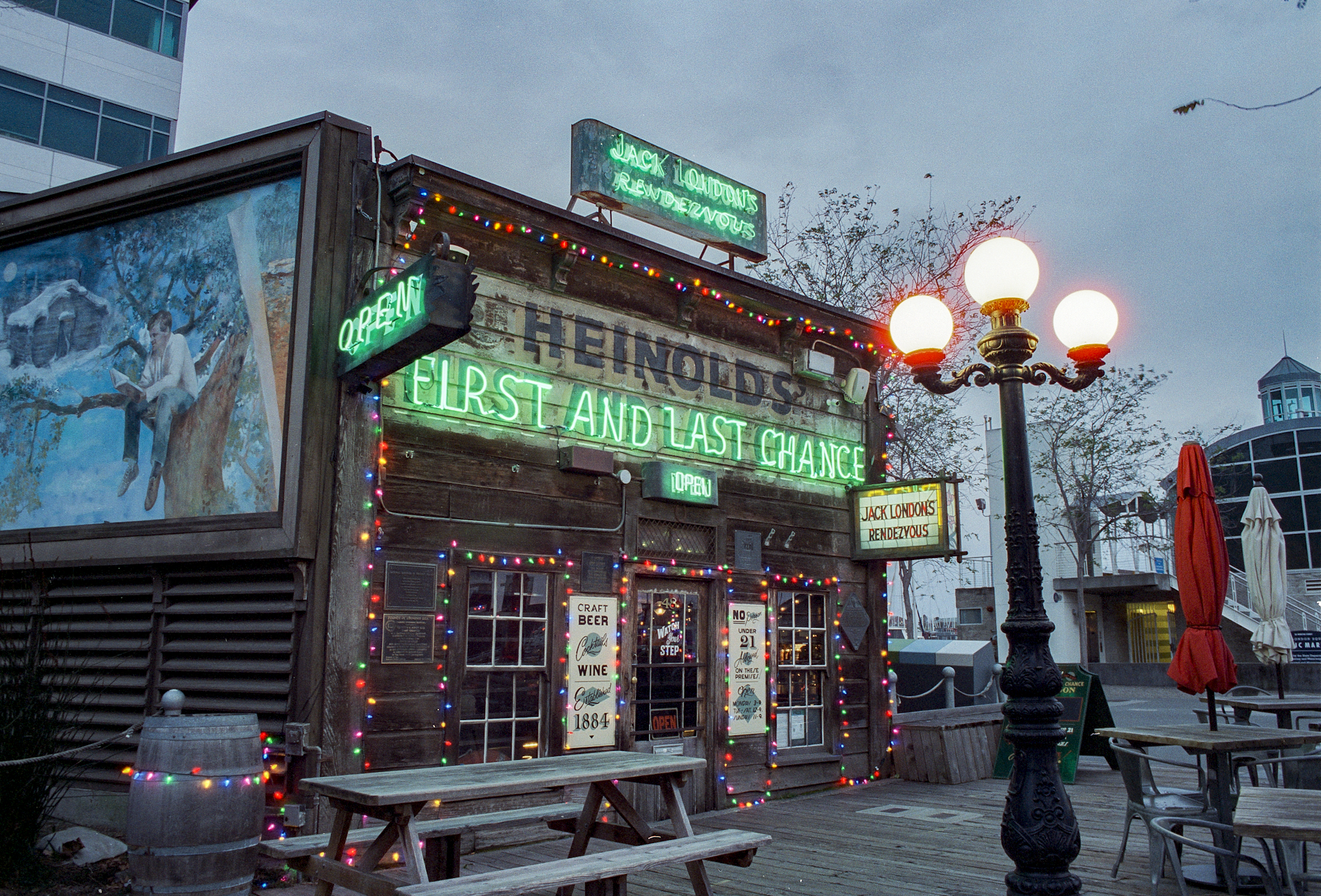
- Heinold’s First and Last Chance in 2025.

- Location within Oakland, California Location within California Location within the United States
- Location: 48 Webster St, Oakland, California
- Coordinates: 37°47′37.5″N 122°16′28.5″W
- Area: less than one acre
- Built: 1880
- Architectural style: Queen Anne, Western false front
- NRHP reference No.: 00001067
- ODL No.: 3

Significant dates
- Added to NRHP: September 1, 2000
- Designated ODL: 1975

Heinold's First and Last Chance is a waterfront saloon opened by John (Johnny) M. Heinold in 1883 on Jack London Square in Oakland, California, United States. The name "First and Last Chance" refers to the time in which for many sailors, the pub was the first and last chance to drink alcohol heavily before or after a long voyage.

Heinold's First and Last Chance is also known as "Jack London's Rendezvous", as it was the inspiration for scenes from the Oakland writer's novels Call of the Wild and The Sea Wolf.

== Beginnings and name ==
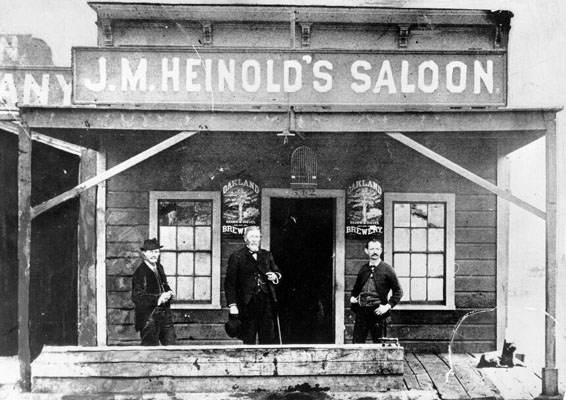
1885, L to R: George Gibson, Sea Capt. Alfred Burrell & Johnny Heinold.

The pub in its original form was a preserved building from 1880, built from the remnants of an old whaling ship at the foot of Webster Street in Oakland, where it remains today. It was originally designed as sleeping quarters for the workers of the nearby oyster beds, and was used as a bunk for nearly three years. In 1883 it was purchased by German-born Philadelphian Johnny Heinold for 100 U.S. dollars and with the help of a ship carpenter, converted into a pub which he named J.M. Heinold's Saloon.

The pub's central location near the ferry between Oakland and Alameda made it a popular first or last destination to drink alcohol, as its consumption and sale were illegal in Alameda. Heinold's First and Last Chance was also a popular spot for sailors leaving or arriving through the Oakland port on long trips, known as the first or last place to drink alcohol in larger quantities. The popular nickname "First and Last" stuck, and the pub's name was eventually officially renamed to Heinold's First and Last Chance.

"Heinold's" is the official, and more accepted, spelling of the name of the establishment, owing to its etymology; despite this, the name of the pub as painted on the front outside wall is "Heinolds'", with the apostrophe presumably erroneously following the S meant to indicate the possessive. "Heinholds", with no apostrophe at all, is a common misspelling.

Heinold's First and Last Chance is one of the two most notable "Last Chance Saloons". The term "last chance" was a name widely used by saloons in the U.S. beginning in the 19th century to indicate to customers that this was the last stop to purchase and consume alcohol before entering a dry county, or other places where alcohol was not easily obtainable.

== Jack London's Rendezvous ==
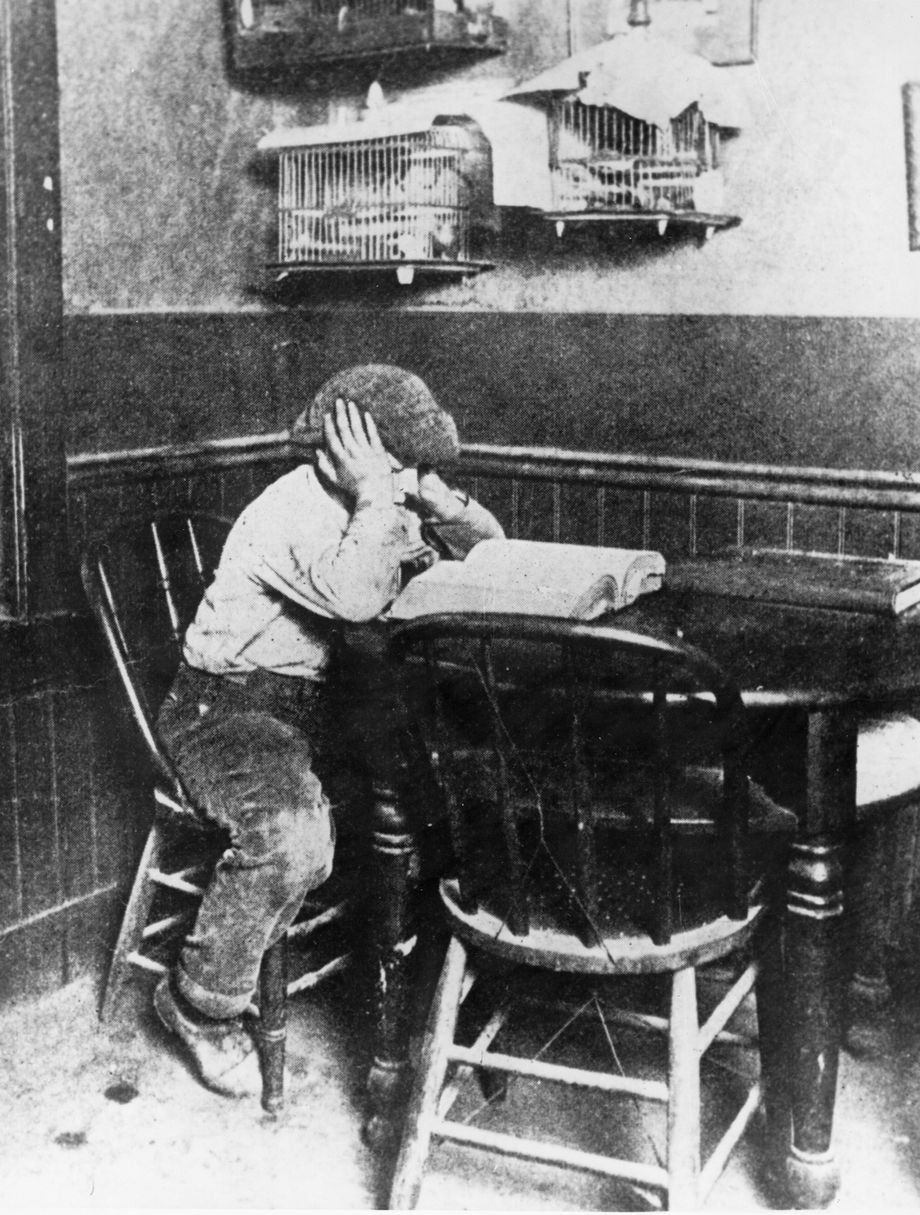
Jack London studying at the bar in 1886

Oakland author Jack London, after spending some time out at sea and traveling throughout the U.S. and Canada, returned to his hometown to complete his high school education. As a schoolboy, London would study at the bar's tables that remain today. At 17, he confessed to Johnny Heinold during his stay at the pub that he was planning to attend university and pursue a career in writing. Heinold lent London the money needed for tuition, and he enrolled at the nearby University of California, Berkeley.

While London only made it through his first year of college, Heinold's pub introduced him to the sailors and adventurers that would influence his writing.

Many of London's evenings were spent at Heinold's pub, gathering ideas for his later works. In his autobiographical novel, John Barleycorn, London mentioned the pub's likeness seventeen times. The pub was the place where London met Alexander McLean, a captain known for his cruelty at sea, on whom the protagonist in London's novel The Sea-Wolf, Wolf Larsen, is based.

Jack London's Rendezvous became the bar's nickname in more recent years because of its influence on the author. A sign was added to the original roof with the title.

== Heinold's today ==
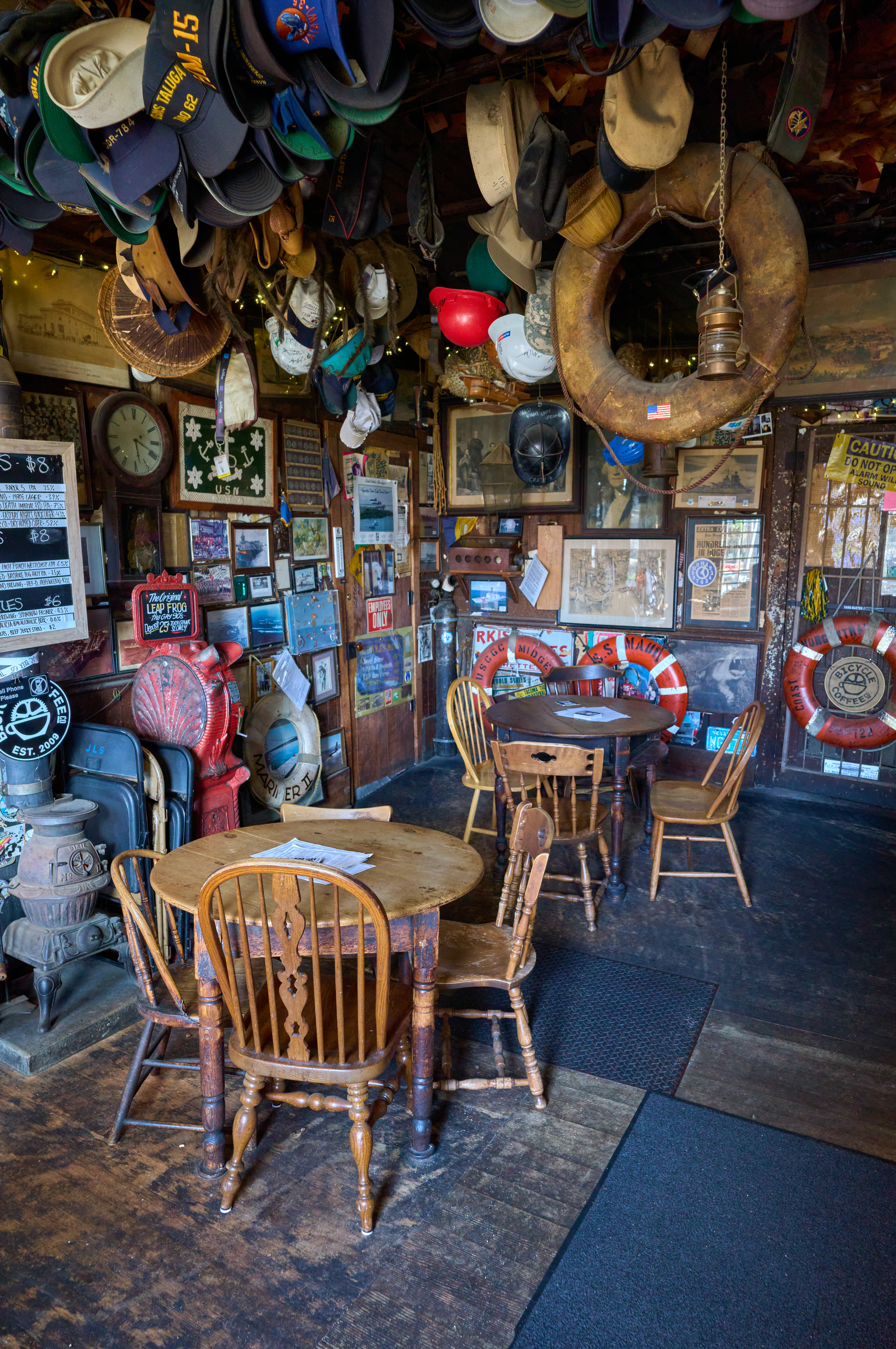
Interior in 2024

John Heinold ran the bar until 1939 when his son, George, took over. George ran the bar until 1969 and then his wife, Margaret, stepped in to run the establishment, continuing the tradition until 1984 when Carol Brookman became the proprietor.

Heinold's is the last commercial establishment in California with its original gas lighting. The tables, which reportedly came from a whaling ship, and other furnishings date back to the days when Johnny Heinold ran the pub. The walls and ceilings are covered with business cards, hats of past patrons and money, often signed by sailors about to deploy so they would have money for a drink waiting for them upon their return.

The bar still holds the original potbellied stove used to warm the room, their only source of heat since 1889. Bob Fitzsimmon's boxing gloves, Jim Jeffries' boxing gloves, and John Heinold's hat remain where they were hung; the original bar glassware and mahogany bar are still in use today.

One of the most notable characteristics of the pub is the very slanted floor. The uneven ground formed in 1906 during the great San Francisco earthquake when a portion of the piles the pub is built on in swampy ground sank. In the corner of Heinold's is a clock that has been stopped since the moment of the 1906 quake, at 5:18.

Some say Heinold's First and Last Chance is haunted. Brookman, the current owner and other saloon employees have reported hearing footsteps and finding doors left open.

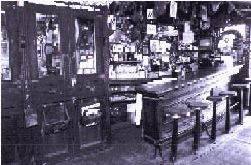
Slanted floor of the bar after the 1906 earthquake

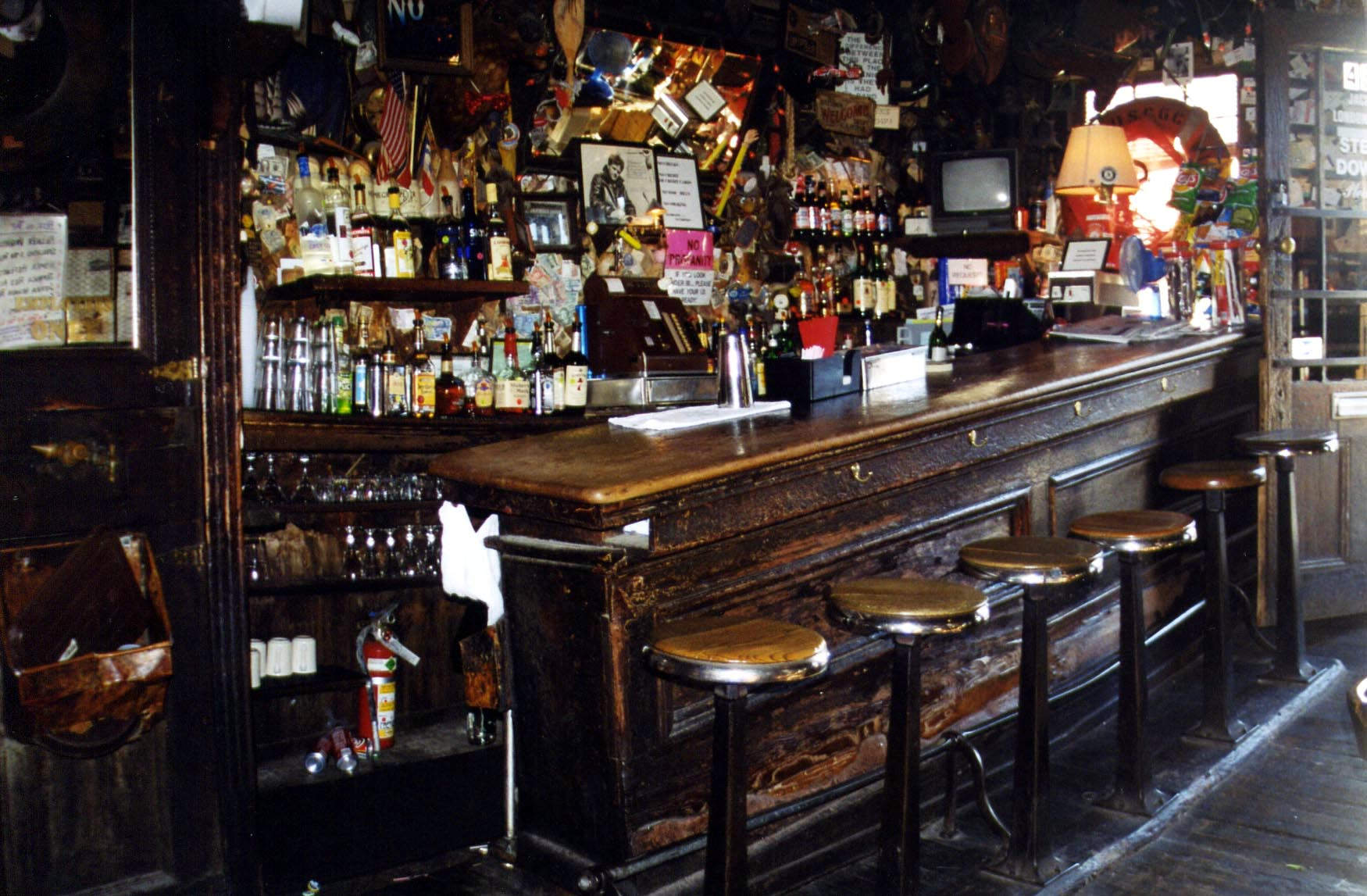
Slanted bar

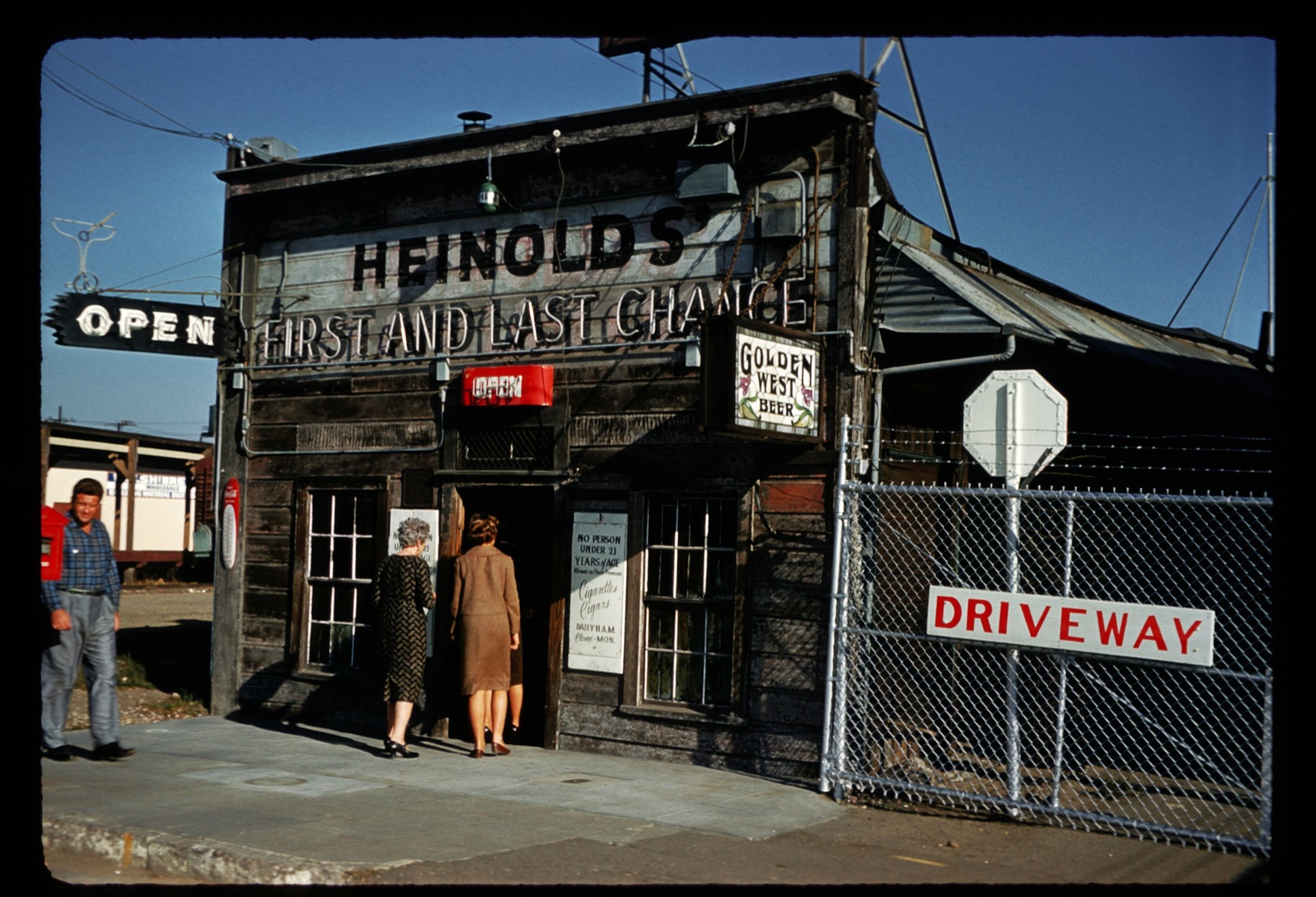
June 1960

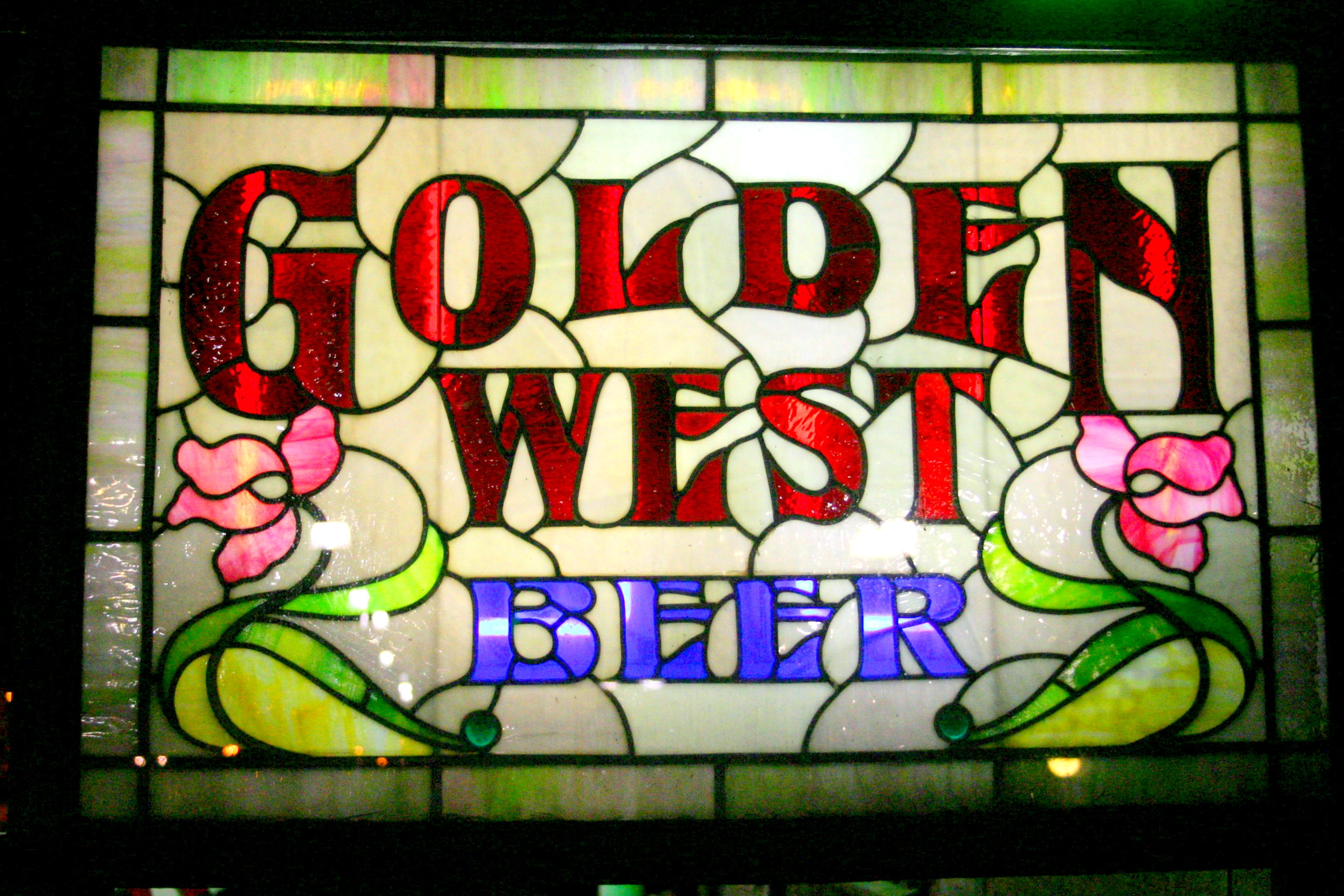
Beer sign outside of the bar

1987

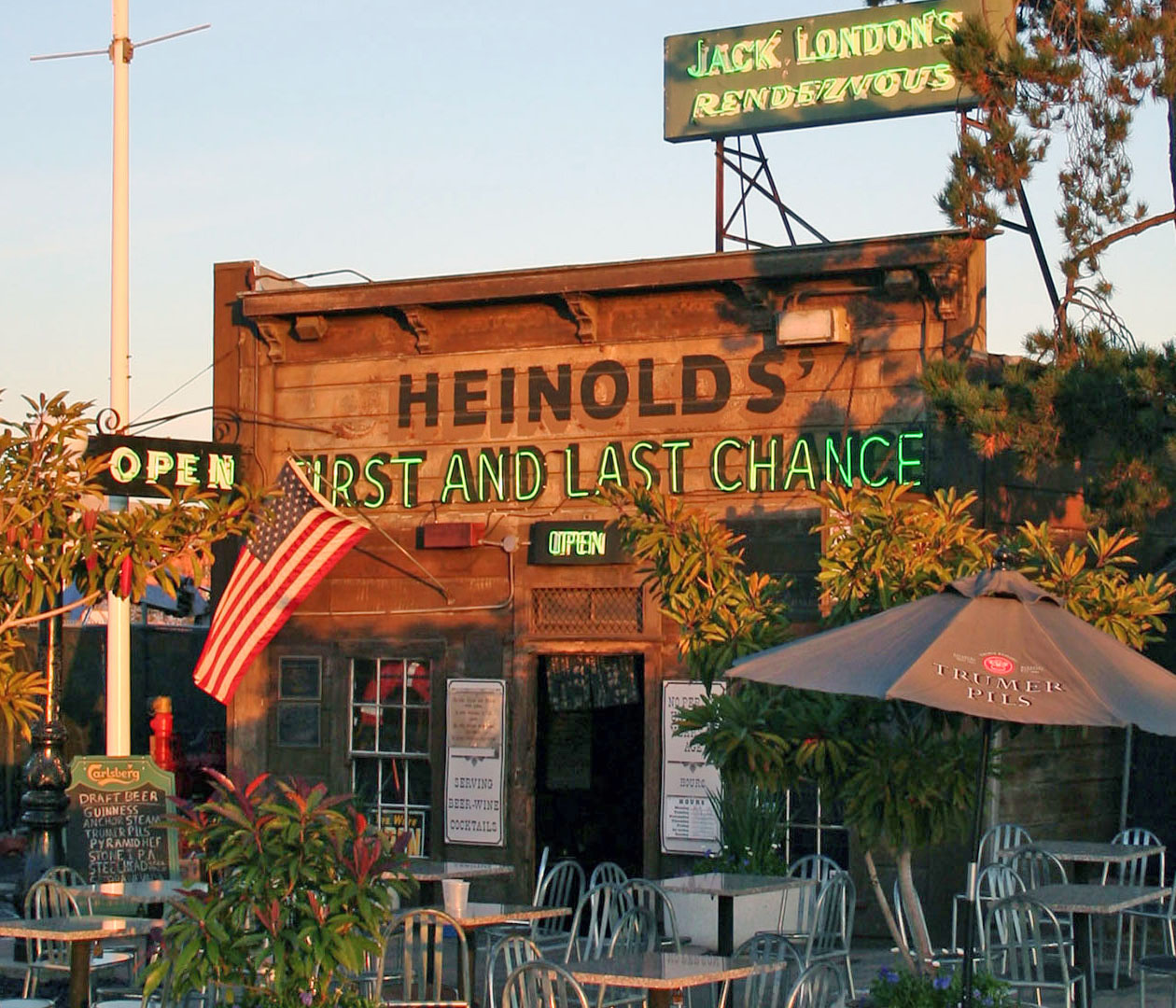
In 2007

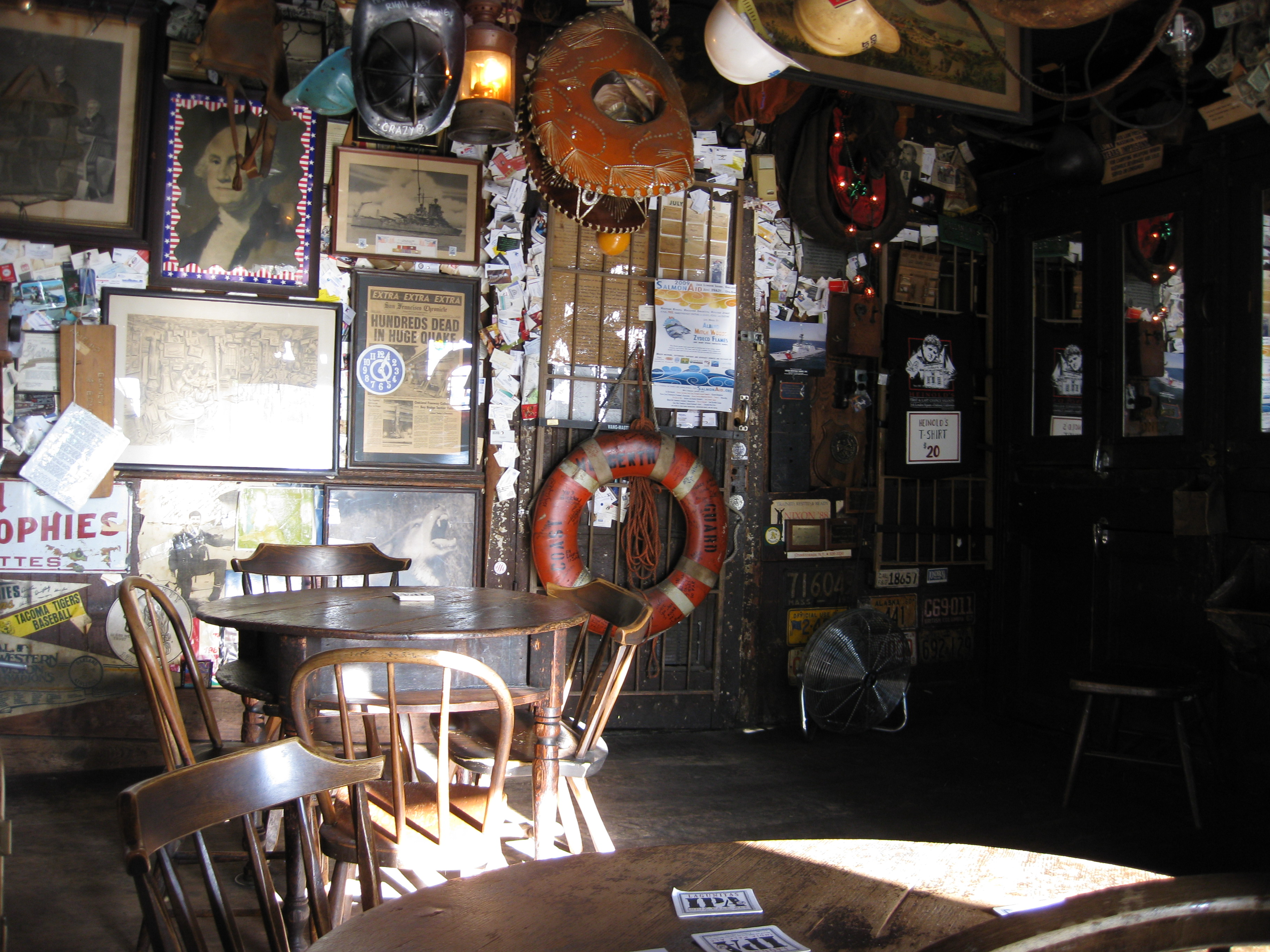
Inside of Heinold's 2009

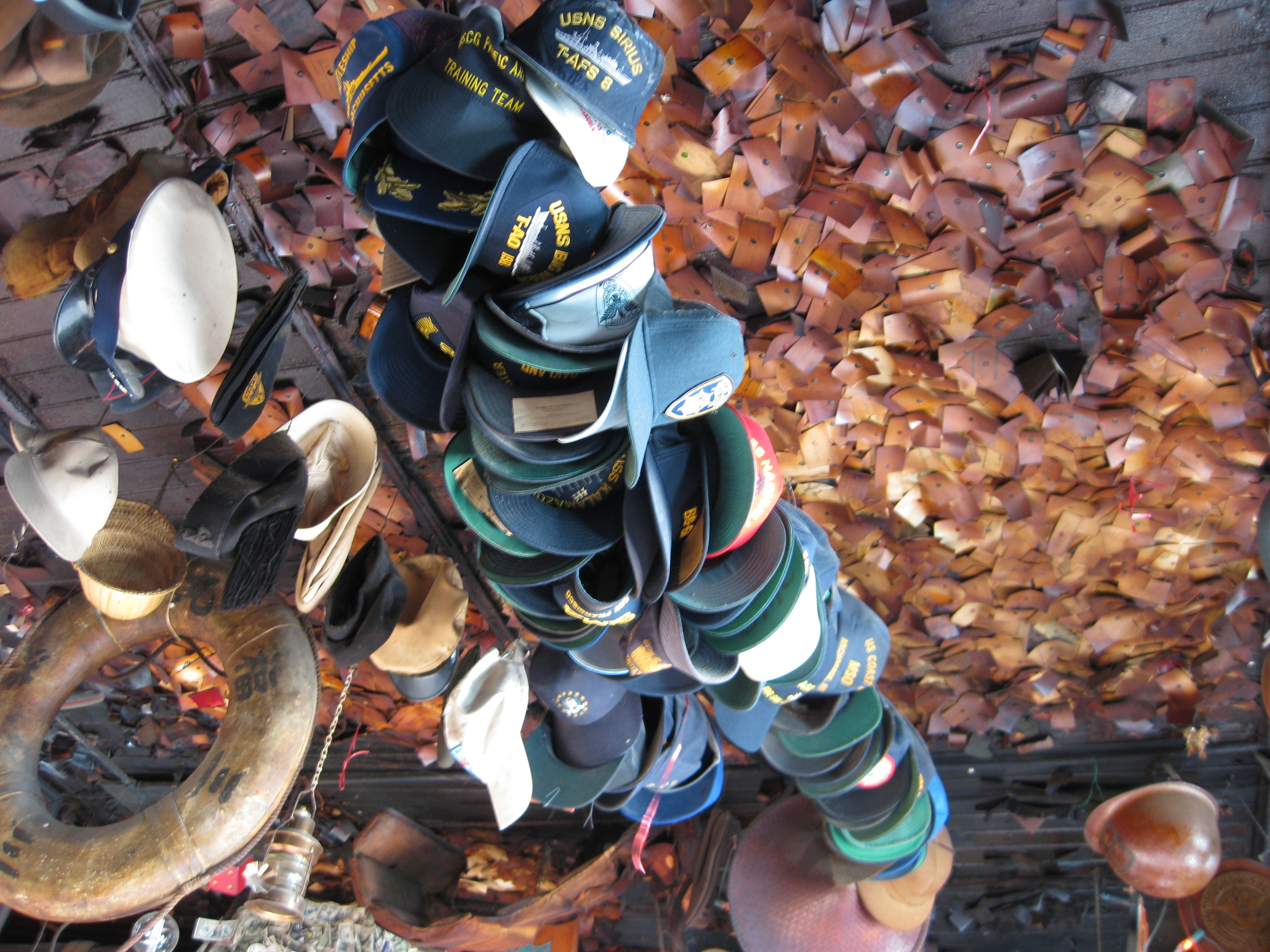
Ceiling of Heinold's in 2009

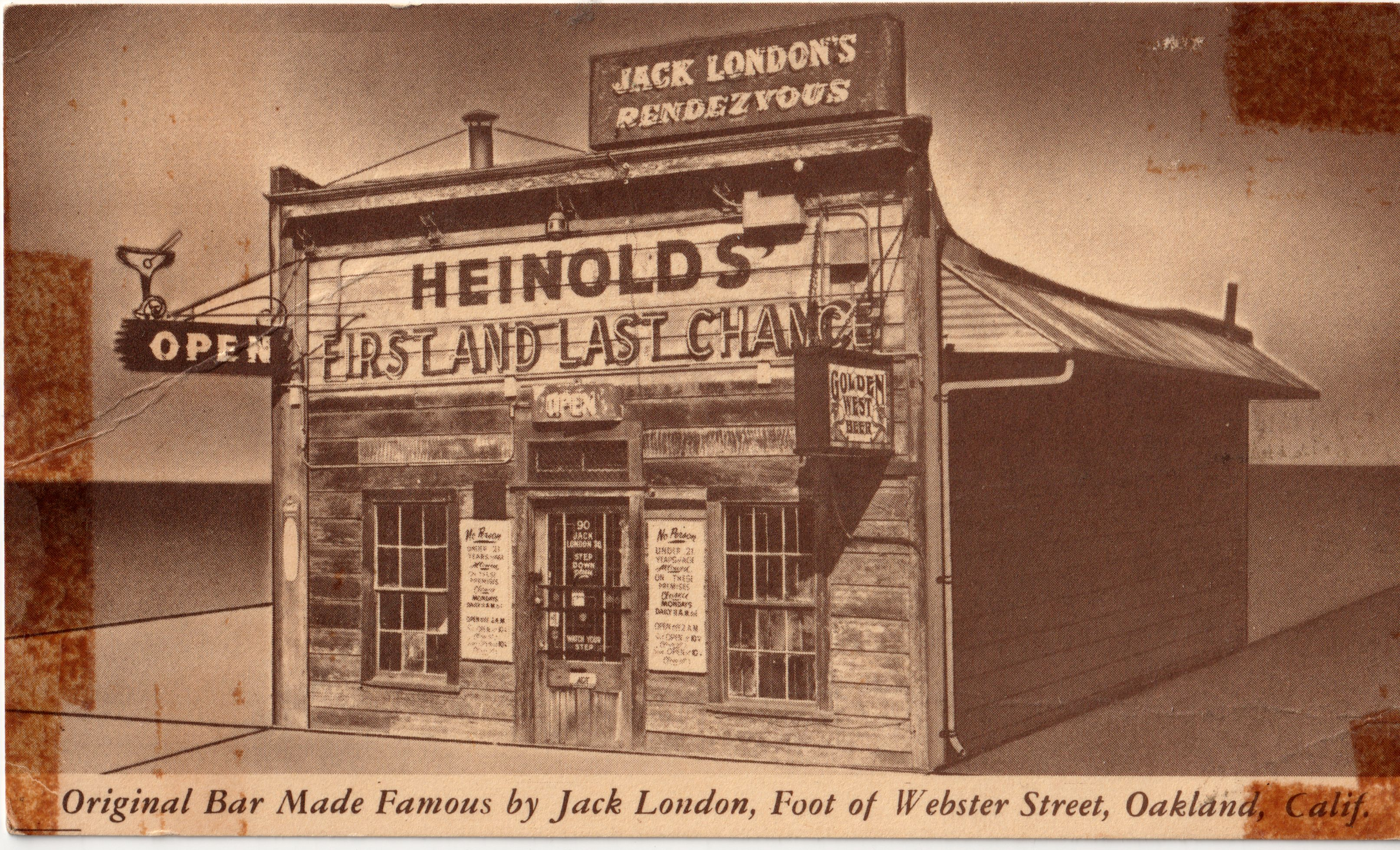
Circa 1960s

== Historical landmark ==
On January 12, 1998 the Friends of Libraries U.S.A. added Heinold's to the Literary Landmarks Register. Outside they placed a plaque that reads:

Literary Landmarks Register designates Heinold's First and Last Chance as a National Literary Landmark. Befriended by Johnny Heinold at this original site, Jack London met many seafaring and waterfront characters which he later immortalized in his adventure novels. Heinold's is referred to several times in his book John Barleycorn.

On September 1, 2000, the United States Federal Government listed Heinold's First and Last Chance on the National Register of Historic Places.

== See also ==
- Historic bars and saloons in San Francisco
