= One More Chance (2005 American film) =

- Directed by: Darrell M. Smith
- Written by: Darrell M. Smith, David Rolland
- Produced by: Darrell M. Smith, Jacques Derosena
- Starring: Darrell M Smith, Jacques Derosena, Caroline Tomas, Bill White, Todd Hunt, Joana Vargas
- Music by: Gwen Wunderlich-Smith
- Distributed by: Navaro Films
- Release date: 2005
- Running time: 16 minutes
- Country: United States
- Language: English

One More Chance is a 2005 drama short film directed by American actor, writer and producer Darrell M. Smith and co-produced by actor Jacques Derosena. It was one of the finalists of the 2005 Gotham City Short Film Festival of John Coogan.

== Plot ==
Finding work when you have just got out of prison is hard — especially acting work.

Devon, an ex-convict recently released from prison, is trying to take back his life and find a job but has many problems with the prejudices and rejection of the society. Jean-Paul is a French manic depressive who has to deal with the accusations made by his ex-wife. When these two characters met, they become friends and eventually decide to go on a journey in order to help each other solve their problems.

== Cast ==
- Darrell M. Smith as Devon
- Jacques Derosena as Jean-Paul
- Caroline Tomas as Marla
- Bill White as Uncle Joe
- Todd Hunt as Craig
- Joana Vargas as the Caretaker
