= One More Chance =

One More Chance may refer to:

== Films ==
- One More Chance (1931 film), an American film starring Bing Crosby and directed by Mack Sennett
- One More Chance (1981 film), an American film by Sam Firstenberg
- One More Chance (2005 American film), a short film by Darrell M. Smith
- One More Chance (2005 Singaporean film), a film by Jack Neo
- One More Chance (2007 film), a Filipino film by Cathy Garcia-Molina

== Songs ==
- "One More Chance" (Bloc Party song), 2009
- "One More Chance" (Diana Ross song), 1981
- "One More Chance" (Madonna song), 1996
- "One More Chance" (Michael Jackson song), 2003
- "One More Chance" (The Notorious B.I.G. song), 1995
- "One More Chance" (Pet Shop Boys song), 1984
- "One More Chance" (Super Junior song), 2017
- "One More Chance" (will.i.am song), 2007
- "One More Chance", by Air Supply from Hearts in Motion, 1986
- "One More Chance", by Anastacia from Not That Kind, 2000
- "One More Chance", by Fairport Convention from Rising for the Moon, 1975
- "One More Chance", by the Jackson 5 from ABC, 1970
- "One More Chance", by the Jacksons from Victory, 1984
- "One More Chance", by Ocean, 1972
- "One More Chance", by Saliva from Blood Stained Love Story, 2007
- "One More Chance", by Survivor from Reach, 2006
- "One More Chance", by Yummy Bingham from The First Seed, 2006

== See also ==
- "Just One More Chance", an episode of Goodnight Sweetheart
- Another Chance (disambiguation)
