= Last Chance, Iowa =

Coordinates: 40°57′23″N 093°33′13″W

Last Chance is a populated place in Lucas County, Iowa, United States. It is located at an elevation of 1,090 feet (330 m) above sea level on a low ridge between White Breast Creek and the Chariton River, 9.5 miles (15.3 km) southwest of Lucas.
