= Last Chance Saloon =

Popular name of a type of bar in the US

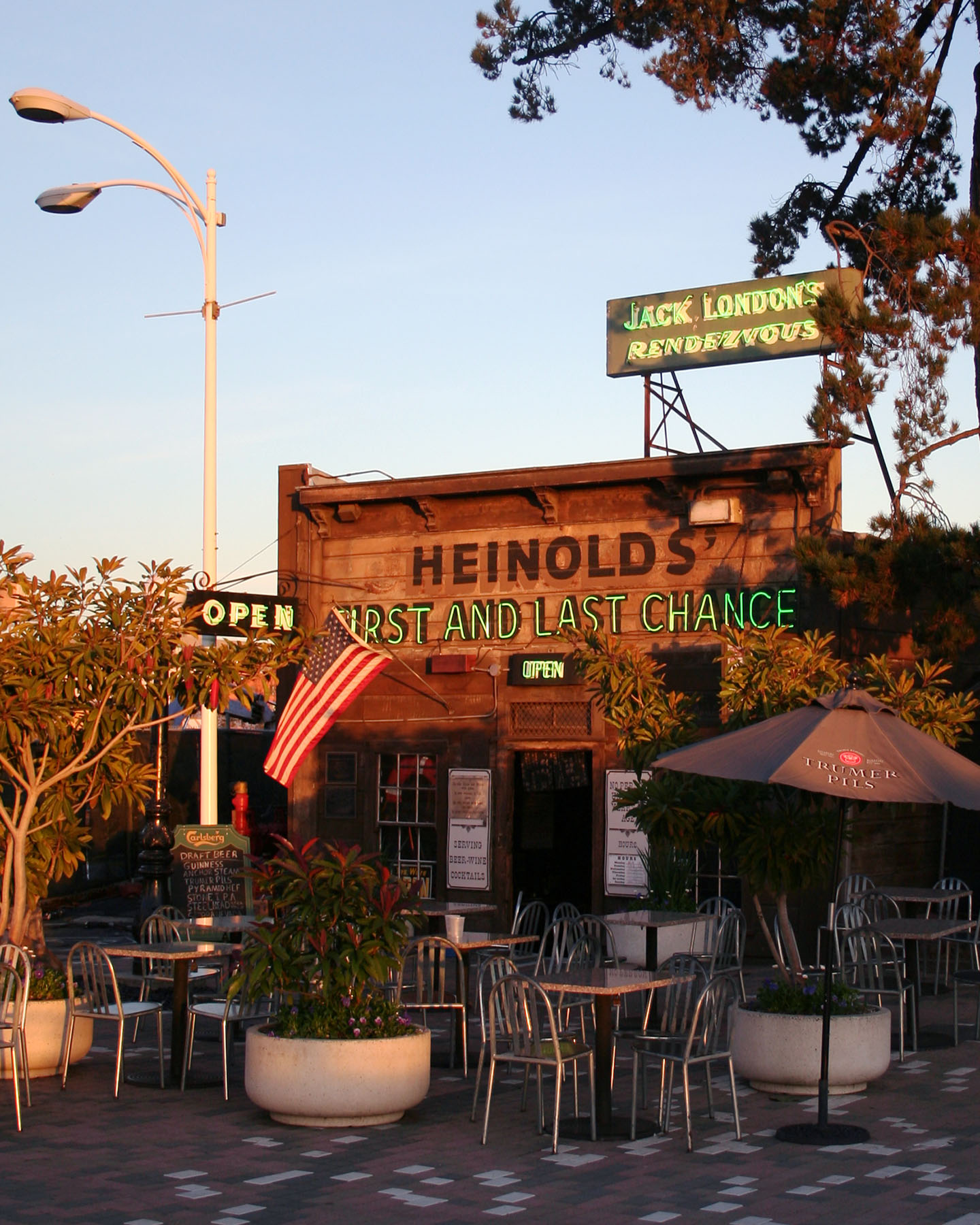
Heinold's First and Last Chance at the waterfront in Oakland, California

Last Chance Saloon was a popular name of a type of bar in the United States that began to appear in the 19th century as an early expression of border economics. Saloons situated near areas where alcohol was not easily obtainable frequently took the name as a literal indication to customers that this was their final opportunity to imbibe before progressing to an area where obtaining, selling or drinking alcoholic drinks was prohibited. The phrase "last chance saloon" also has common British metaphorical use, based upon this historical context.

== A lot of "last chances" ==
While the term refers to actual places that existed, it does not refer to a singular place. Many saloons on the border of dry areas incorporated the phrase "last chance" into their name. Of the many saloons so named, two have found particular notoriety, to the extent that they may be sometimes be referred to today with a definite article, as in "The Last Chance Saloon".

The first is one in Caldwell, Kansas. Dating from 1869, it was the last place travellers could legally buy liquor before moving into Indian Territory, where alcohol was banned. It gained prominence during an incident in 1874, when a posse from Caldwell burned down the building, after erroneously believing that the objects of their search were inside. Because of this fire, it does not exist today, but the building's site is currently marked by the State of Kansas as a place of historical interest.

The second is the "Heinold's First and Last Chance" in Oakland, California. It was opened in 1883. Located on the docks of Oakland, it would have been the last chance for drinkers to imbibe before falling under the jurisdiction of their boat's captain. While it was not a legally dry area, a boat could often be practically dry. Even if a captain chose to allow alcohol, it would have been relatively scarce and usually tightly regulated—if the boat's hold had space for it at all. Thus, Heinold's saloon served precisely the same practical function as the Caldwell example. It was made arguably more famous because noted American author Jack London was an irregular patron. When in Oakland, London drank there often, gleaning insight from the tales of world-traveling sailors. Not only is the saloon commemorated by name in London's works, it is recognized by the California State historical marker program, the National Literary Landmark scheme, and the National Register of Historic Places. Heinold's continues as a working business, maintained privately for the benefit of locals and tourists.

Technically, both of these businesses were also signed as "First Chance" saloons, as the proprietors wanted to market their business for travellers, irrespective of their customers' direction of travel.

The name persists in the naming of modern bars, though it is not always associated with the original meaning. Bars nowhere close to a dry county are sometimes named "Last Chance Saloon" as an homage to the earlier establishments. There are (First and) Last Chance Saloons in the phone books of almost every American state.

== As a metaphor ==
In everyday speech, by speakers of British English, the term has been adopted to describe a situation beyond which hope or good fortune will greatly diminish.

"This is the last chance saloon. If we again fail to improve the performance of our schools I believe it is time to look at the reintroduction of selection at the age of 13, to reintroduce grammar schools which were the great escape route for the working class in post-war Britain."

— David Frost of the British Chambers of Commerce

"At least, that's the way it had been until Monty arrived, although I have to admit we all thought: Here we go again. We've heard it all before. But he and everybody else knew very well that this had to be the last stand. We were definitely in the Last Chance Saloon."

— Quote from World War 2 diary extract

Because of its infrequent use in relation to alcohol or bars, "last chance saloon" is usually employed as a paralogical metaphor.

The expression often lends itself to newspaper headlines, as it describes a complex situation in a relatively scant number of letters. Home Office minister David Mellor in a December 1989 television interview asserted: "I do believe the press – the popular press – is drinking in the Last Chance Saloon". The ethics of the British press were then being scrutinized by the Calcutt Committee and the phrase caught on. In another example, John Major's 1995 attempt to stave off critics by calling for a Conservative Party leadership election was famously headlined in The Independent as "John Major's Last Chance Saloon"—but there are many others.

=== British automotive journalism ===
A subset of the general use for the term is its use among British automotive journalists. Because saloon has a uniquely British automotive meaning, applying the phrase "last chance saloon" to a story about cars is to use a pun. Thus, it is common to see the phrase applied to the automotive industry. For example, the launch of the Rover 75 was humorously described by the then BMW owners as "Rover's Last Chance Saloon", and Cerberus' 2007 acquisition of Chrysler has been called that car manufacturer's "last chance saloon".

=== British sports journalism ===
The phrase has a specialized use in British sport. In youth sport, it specifically defines a qualifying round of competition—the "Last Chance Saloon Round" — comprising students from schools who don't have a mechanism in place to determine a winner at the local level. Because a Last Chance Saloon Round does not connote anything substandard about a participants' skills, but merely the way in which their school participates in regional tournaments, this usage is slightly different from how it is used in Britain to describe professional sport. Sports commentators and fans will often use the phrase in conjunction with professional or Olympic athletics to speak of a waning team or player's last opportunity to make good on their talents.

== In popular culture ==
=== Literature ===
- Irish author Marian Keyes released a novel called Last Chance Saloon, which saw its first US printing in 2001. Set in London, it was the story of several thirty-somethings who reach a point of decision in their personal lives. The novel was well-received, earning a place on Amazon.com's "Best of 2001" list.

=== Music ===
- The Bluetones released an album in 1998 entitled Return to the Last Chance Saloon.
- Climax Blues Band song named "The Last Chance Saloon" from their album, Lucky for Some

=== Television and film ===
- In Doctor Who, the fictitious Last Chance Saloon in Tombstone, Arizona was the focus of the First Doctor serial, The Gunfighters (1966). It is there that the Clanton brothers hang out for most of the story, ready to shoot either the Doctor (mistaken for Doc Holliday) or Steven or Dodo. The Ballad of the Last Chance Saloon is the musical piece that is heard at various places through the serial.
- In Red Dwarf, the Last Chance Saloon was the saloon in Kryten's subconscious when he was battling the Armageddon virus in the series 6 episode "Gunmen of the Apocalypse".
- In Xiaolin Showdown, the Last Chance Saloon is where the monks fight a live painting of a cowboy.
