= Last Chance Creek =

Last Chance Creek may refer to:

- The creek in which the Four Georgians discovered gold, in what is now Helena, Montana
  - Last Chance Gulch, the main street of Helena, Montana, beneath which flows what remains of this creek
- Last Chance Creek (Plumas County, California)
- A creek in southern Utah
- A creek in Yukon Territory, Canada
- A creek in Alaska

There are probably many other creeks with this name, as it was common for prospectors to decide that a particular location was their "last chance" to find gold before having to return for supplies.
