= Darrell M. Smith =

American actor

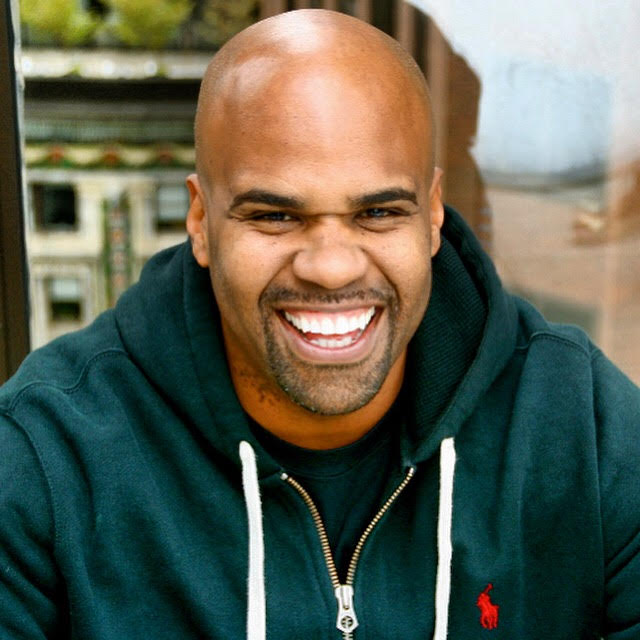
- Born: Darrell M. Smith; June 22, 1971 (age 55); Washington, D.C., U.S.
- Education: Norfolk State University, NYC School of Visual Arts
- Occupations: Actor, Producer, Entrepreneur
- Years active: 2001-present
- Partner(s): Carla V. Lopez (1996-2005); Gwen Wunderlich (2008-2016); Karina Y. Sotelo (2017-Present)
- Children: 1 son Diamanté (a.k.a. DJ Carnage)
- Website: https://www.imdb.com/name/nm1875757/

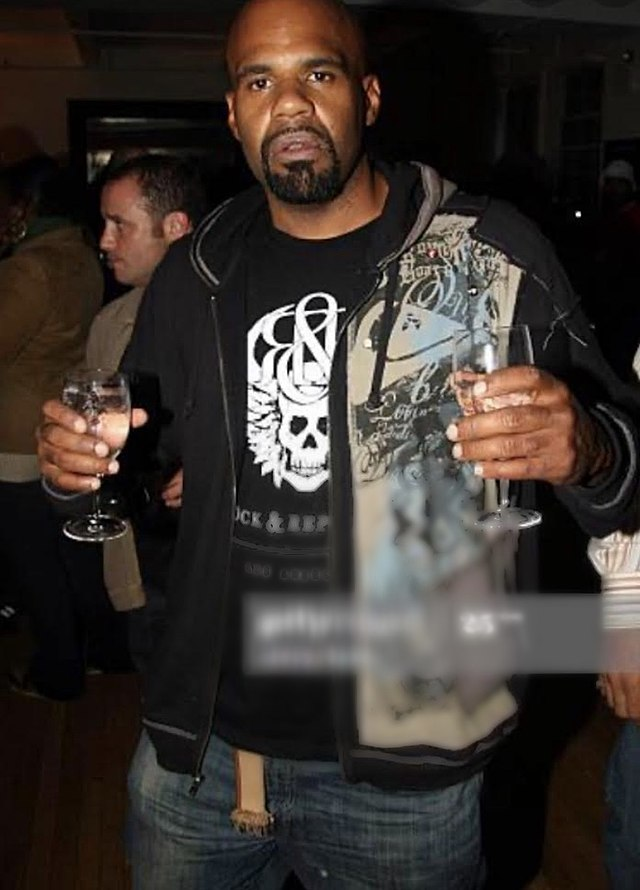
Smith out in NYC back in 2007. Photo by Johnny Nunez

Darrell Michael Smith (born June 22, 1971) is an American actor, producer and entrepreneur. He is an actor who identifies with characters defined by their grace, dignity, humanity, and inner strength.

== Career ==
Darrell M Smith is an American Actor. Smith made his professional debut with The Potomac Theatre Company in off-Broadway plays.

Smith's first film role was in " High's and Lows" in which he also was one of the executive producers. Smith then made TV appearances on "The King Of Queens" and "JAG." Smith played the leading man role of Devon in the drama film called "One More Chance" in which he Exec. Produced, produced, wrote and directed. The movie was nominated for BEST FILM at The Gotham Short Film Awards in New York City. Smith did most of the casting from his classmates at a Stella Adler Studio of Acting workshop that he was attending at the time in New York City. Smith then played officer Turner on the critically acclaimed HBO TV drama " THE WIRE " in season 4 as a recurring guest star.

He appeared on Dr.Oz for a segment on Breast Cancer for Breast Cancer awareness month. Smith played the lead role of Jim in the film "Ugly Enough," a comedy. He has a guest appearance on the 23rd season of NBC /Universal TV drama Law & Order as James a protester. Darrell is a very charismatic person and he brings his charisma to every role. He identifies most with characters that show the good side of humanity, ingenuity, strength and who endure to success.

== Other Endeavors ==
In 2017 Darrell M. Smith co-founded We Are Throne, Inc., a company that is based in SoHo, Manhattan. The company's mission is to tell impactful stories through media, film and technology.
