= Last Chance (2016 film) =

- Directed by: Kamal Saleh
- Written by: Kamal Saleh
- Starring: Ibrahim Tana; Steve Dabliz
- Cinematography: Kamal Saleh; Belal Abdelaal; Rami Alcheikh
- Production company: OnePath Network
- Release date: 15 October 2016
- Running time: 42 Minutes
- Country: Australia
- Language: English

Last Chance is a 2016 Australian drama short film directed by Kamal Saleh. The film was written to break stereotypical views of religious Muslims and give a moral message to the youth and warning them of drugs and gangs activities.

== Plot ==
Set in South-western Sydney, the story revolves around a young man who tries to take a shortcut in life by selling drugs in order to achieve a luxurious lifestyle. His family and friends try to help him and all things rotate around these realities and how this should be approached from an Islamic perspective.

== Cast ==
- Ibrahim Tana: Ibby
- Steve Dabliz: Stuzz
- Mohamed Hoblos: Himself
- Shane Ali: Worker
- Ahmed Bassal: Manager

== Production ==
The film is a production of Islamic-themed media outlet, OnePath Network. Since releasing the film trailer, the production studio has been asked to screen the film overseas.

== Release and reception ==
It was premiered at Waterview, Sydney Olympic. Last Chance gained attention in Australia because it was the first Islamic short film to be made and screened in Australian cinemas. And was screened in the UK across cinemas in a ten-day tour.
