= Shorland (album) =

Studio album by Moke
- Released: 30 March 2007
- Genre: Indie rock Britpop
- Length: 41:38
- Label: Play It Again Sam
- Producer: Joeri Saal

Shorland is the debut album by Dutch rock band Moke.

On 16 May 2008, Moke released the Limited Festival Edition of Shorland. This is a special edition with a second bonusdisc.

== Track listing ==
1. "This Plan" – 3:42
2. "Last Chance" – 4:06
3. "Emigration Song" – 6:01
4. "Here Comes the Summer" – 3:58
5. "Rule the World" – 4:43
6. "The Long Way" – 4:13
7. "We'll Dance" – 3:30
8. "Only One I Had" – 3:28
9. "The Song That You Sing" – 2:51
10. "Bygone" – 5:06

=== Limited Festival Edition disc 2 ===
1. "This Plan" (Live At Paradiso)
2. "Bygone" (Live At Paradiso)
3. "Last Chance" (Live At Paradiso)
4. "Cupar Street Riot" (Live At Paradiso)
5. "The Song That You Sing" (Live At Paradiso)
6. "Here Comes The Summer" (Live At Paradiso)
7. "Cupar Street Riot"
8. "Heart Without A Home"
9. "We'll Dance" (We'Ll Dance Remix - Vs Don Diablo)
10. "Last Chance" (Video)
11. "Here Comes The Summer" (Video)
12. "Heart Without A Home" (Video)
13. "This Plan", NOS Rehearsals (Video)
14. "Here Comes the Summer", NOS Rehearsals (Video)
15. "Last Chance", NOS Rehearsals (Video)
16. "This Plan", Rockpalast (Video)
17. "Heart Without A Home", Rockpalast (Video)
18. "We'll Dance", Rockpalast (Video)

== Charts ==
=== Weekly charts ===
Chart (2007–08)	Peak position
Dutch Albums (Album Top 100)	13

=== Year-end charts ===
Chart (2007)	Position
Dutch Albums (Album Top 100)	90
Chart (2008)	Position
Dutch Albums (Album Top 100)	88
