= Vollmer House =

1876 historic house in San Francisco

- Building at 1735–1737 Webster Street
- U.S. National Register of Historic Places
- California Historical Landmark
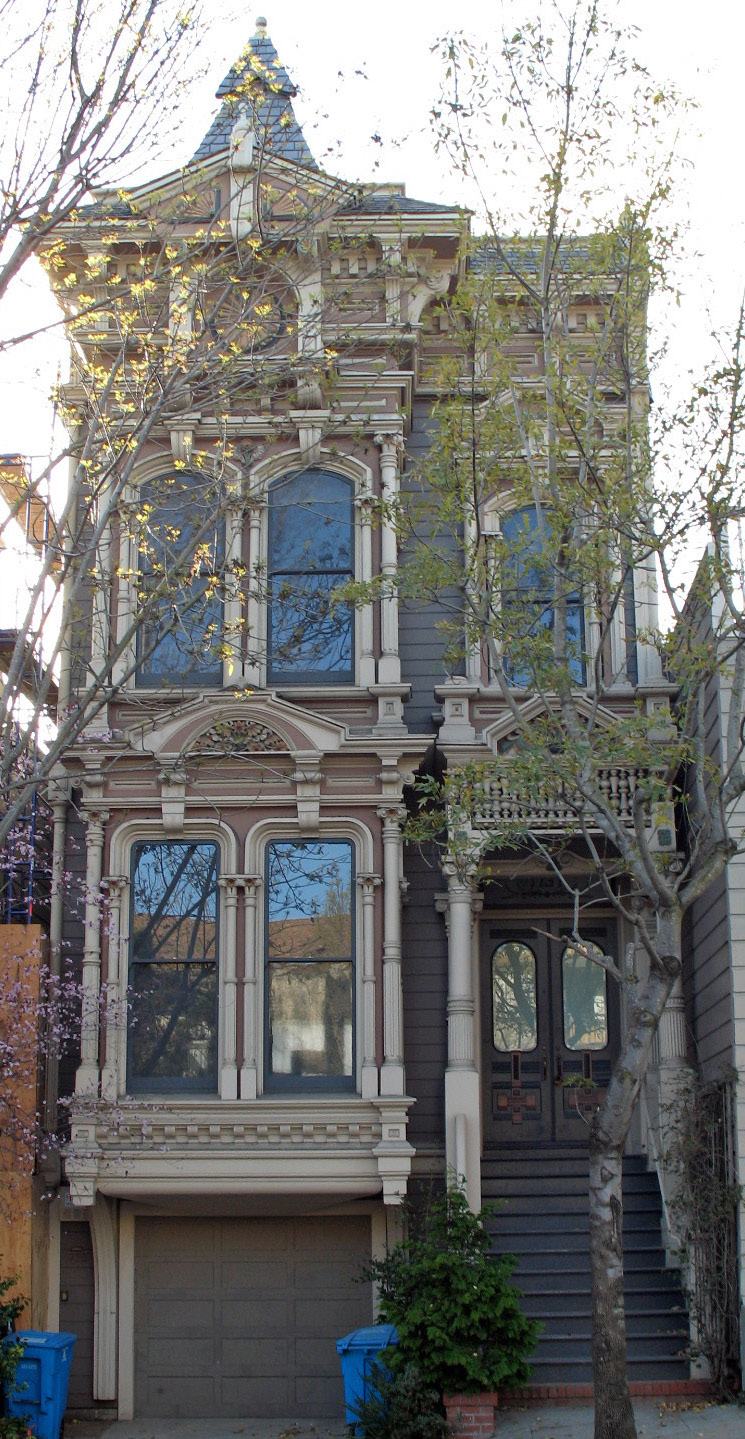

- Location within San Francisco County Location within California Location within the United States
- Location: 1735–1737 Webster Street, San Francisco, California, U.S.
- Coordinates: 37.786899363905775°N 122.43190975433838°W
- Area: 0.1 acres (0.040 ha)
- Built: 1876
- Architect: Newsom Brothers
- Architectural style: Stick/Eastlake
- NRHP reference No.: 73000444
- CHISL No.: N206

Significant dates
- Added to NRHP: March 8, 1973
- Designated CHISL: March 8, 1973

The Vollmer House is a historic house built between 1876 and 1885, and located in the Japantown area in San Francisco, California. The house is known for its outstanding decorative details on the exterior.

It was listed as a California Historical Landmark since March 8, 1973; and on the National Register of Historic Places as "Building at 1735–1737 Webster Street" on March 8, 1973. This building is near the Bush Street–Cottage Row Historic District.

== History ==
The Vollmer House was built between 1876 and 1885, at 773 Turk Street near Franklin Street in San Francisco. The exact date of the house is unknown and it is possible it was as early as 1876, as the San Francisco Water Department records show this building was connected to the water system that year. The house was designed by the Newsom Brothers (Samuel Newsom and Joseph Newsom) in a Stick/Eastlake-style, and was built for F. Vollerni. The second owner was German-born John J. Vollmer and his family, which had previously lived up the block. Vollmer ran a corner grocery store at Turk Street and Franklin Street. The house escaped damages during the 1906 San Francisco earthquake and fires.

The San Francisco Redevelopment Agency purchased the property in 1967; and by 1974 they relocated the property from Western Addition (due to re-zoning) to its current address at 1735–1737 Webster Street, between Sutter and Bush Streets.

Vollmer House
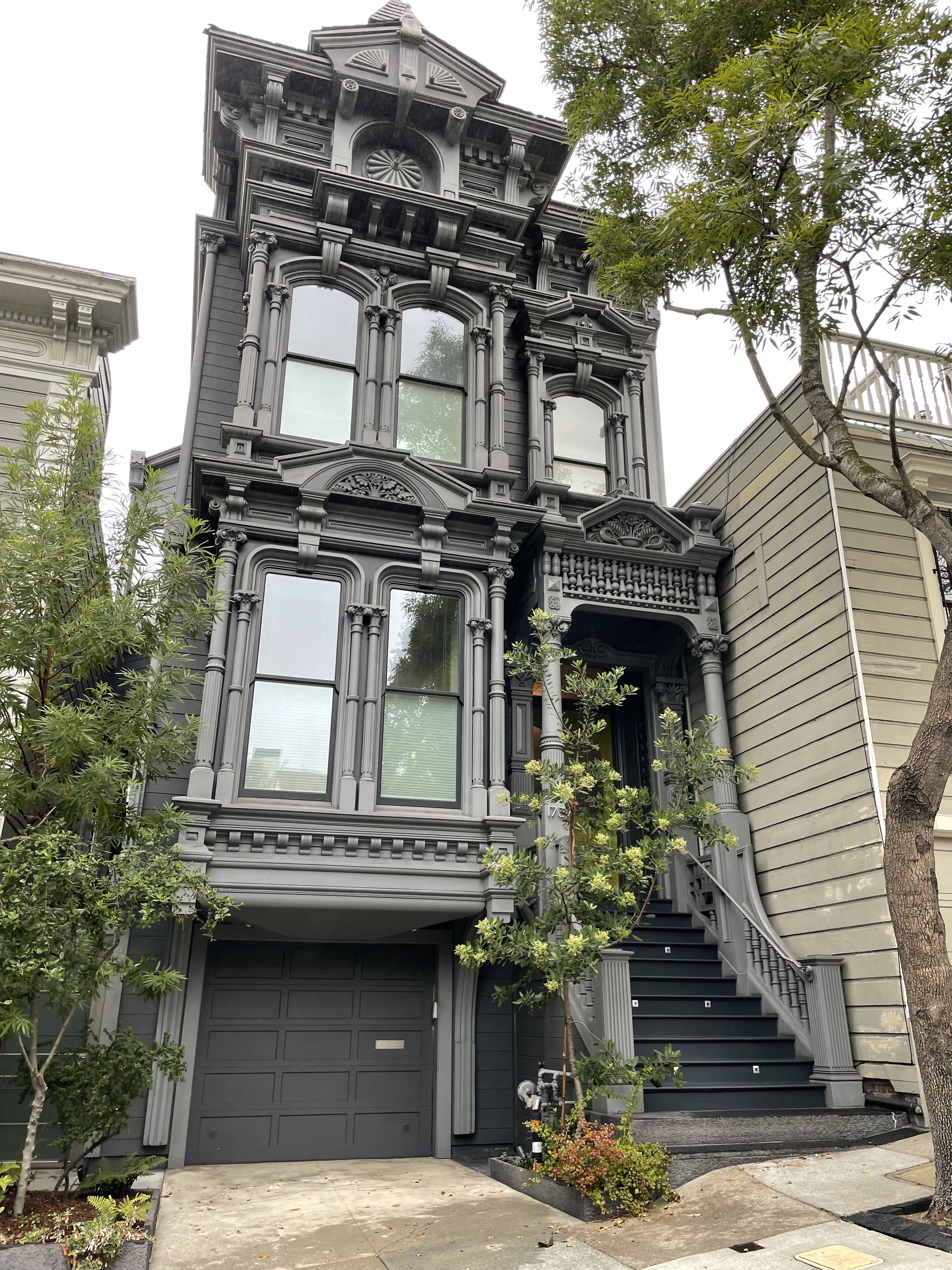
Vollmer House, June 2021, Webster Street, San Francisco

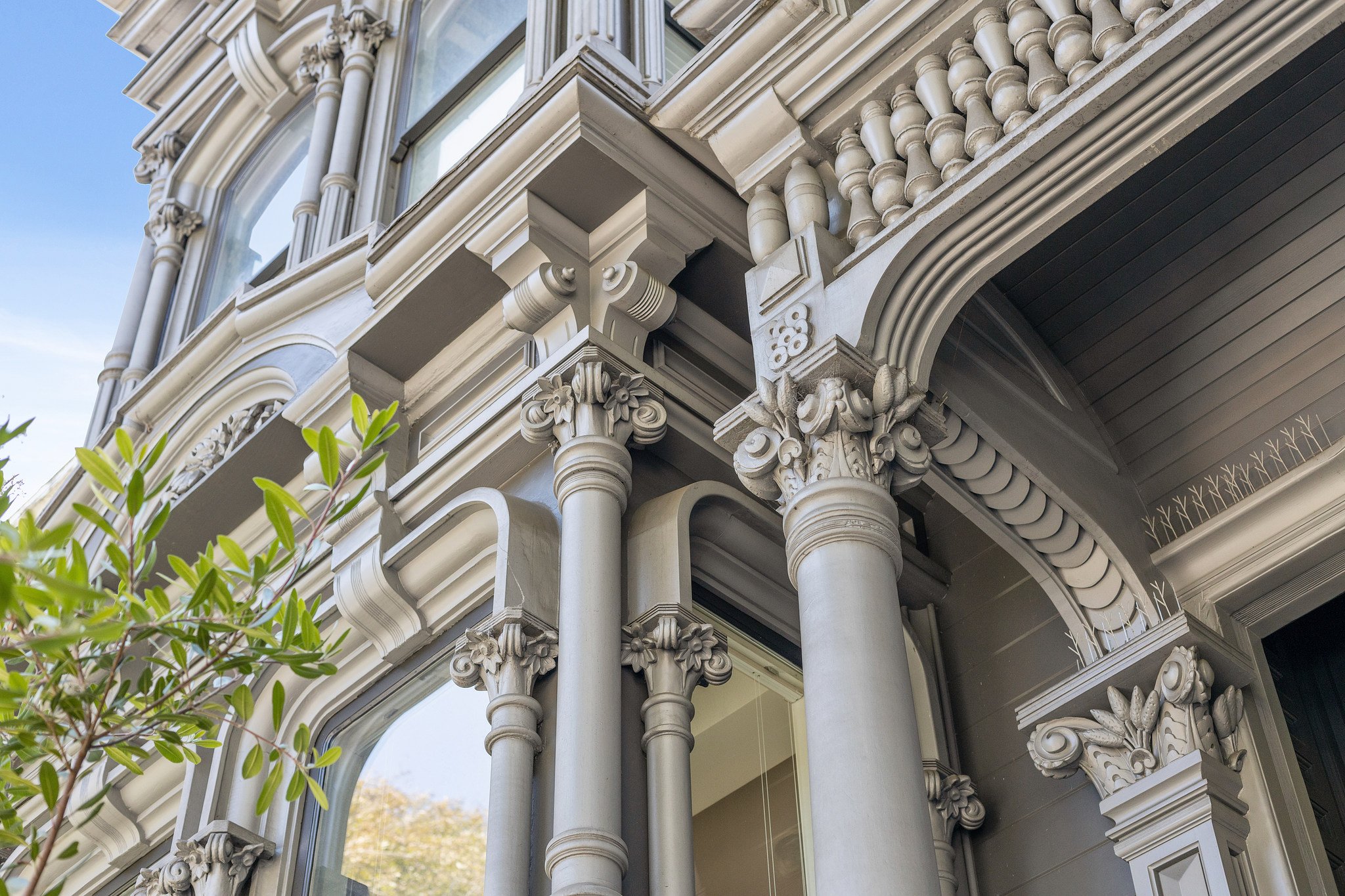
Vollmer House facade woodwork detail in June 2020

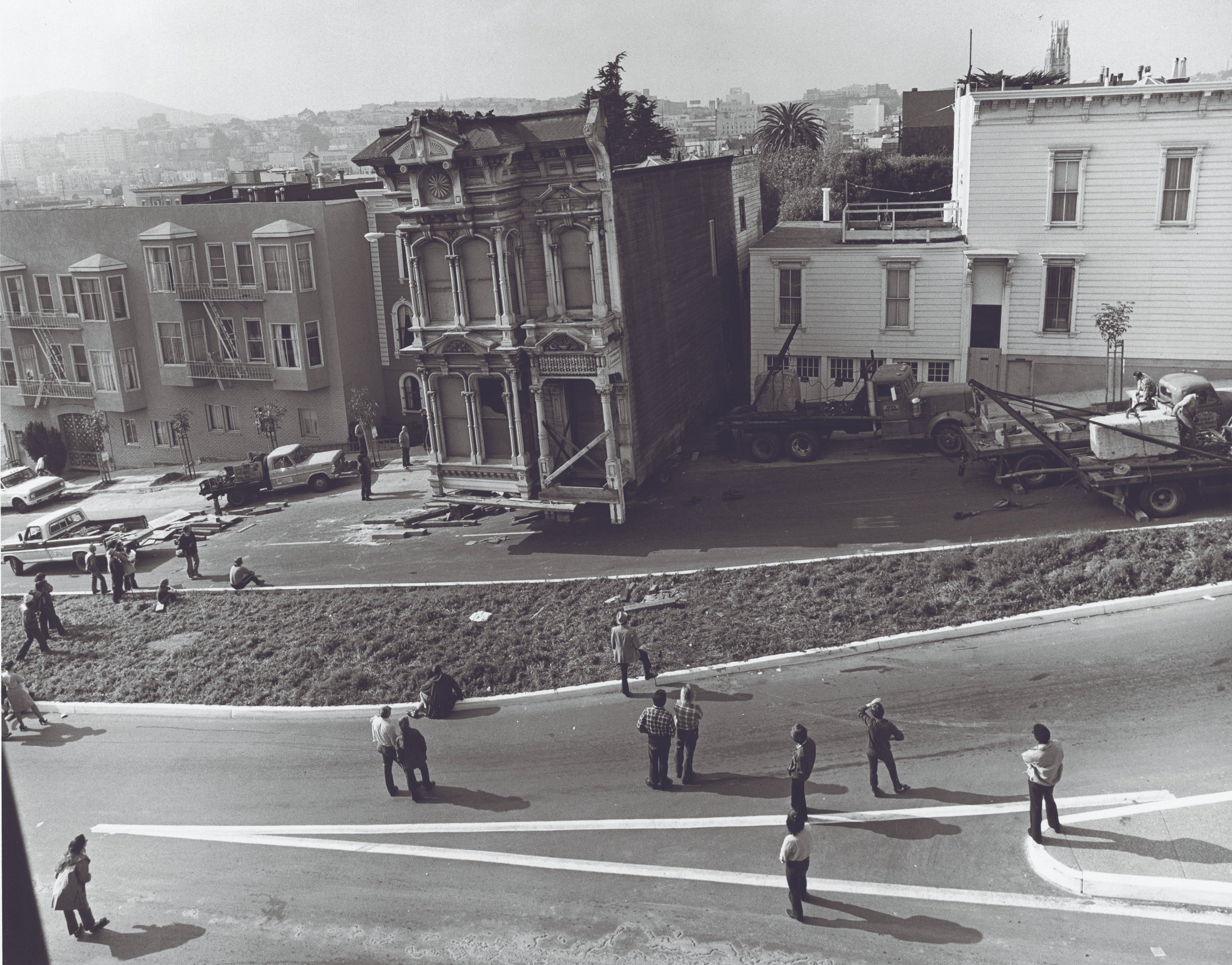
Vollmer House moving to new location on Webster Street

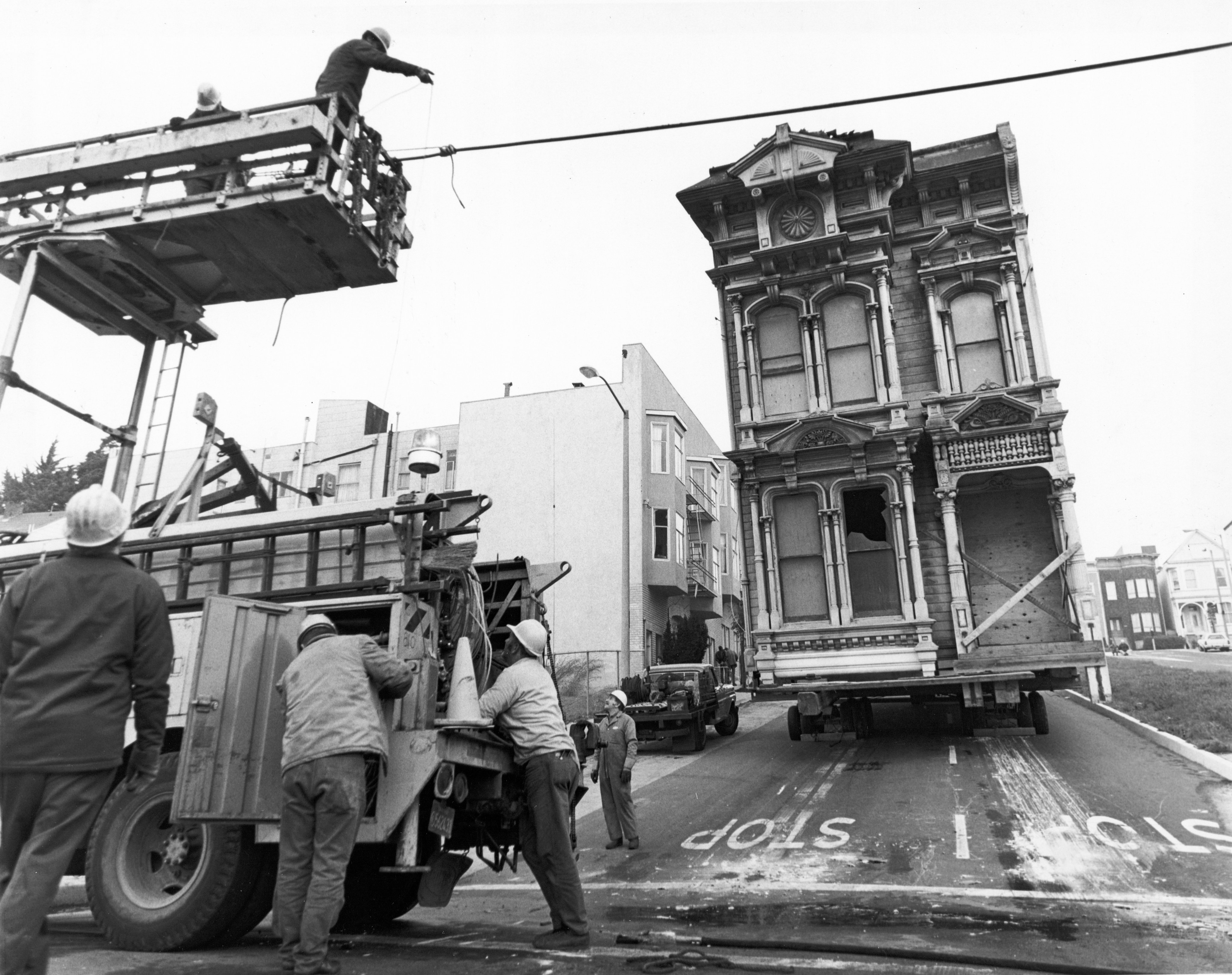
Vollmer House moving to new location, facing north on Webster Street, San Francisco, CA

== See also ==
- National Register of Historic Places listings in San Francisco
- California Historical Landmarks in San Francisco
