= Japantown, San Francisco =

Japantown 日本町
- Neighborhood
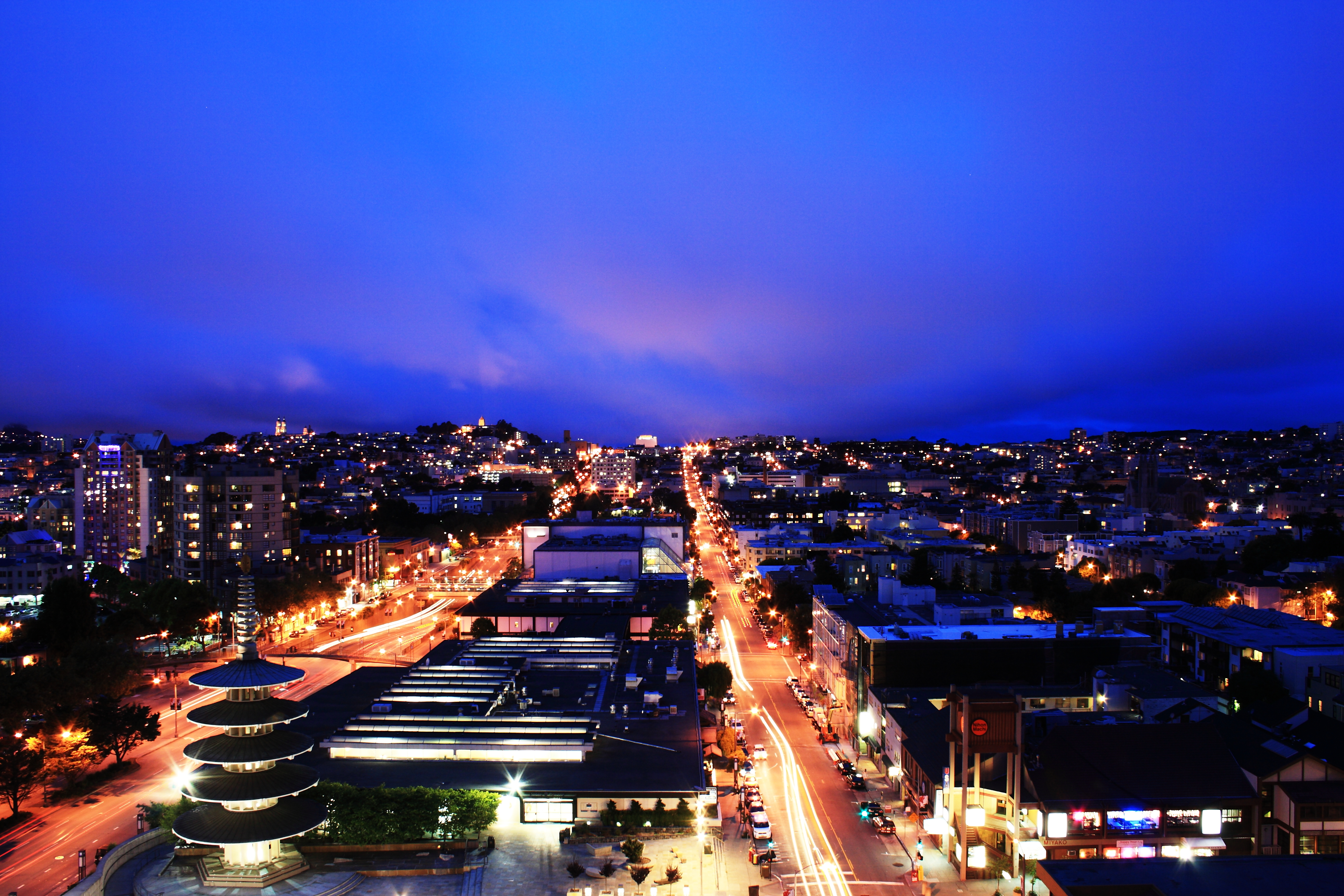
- View from Kabuki Hotel facing west. Below is the Japan Center and Peace Pagoda
- Nickname: Little Osaka
- Location within Central San Francisco
- Coordinates: 37.7851°N 122.4298°W
- Country: United States
- State: California
- City-county: San Francisco

Government
  - Supervisor: Bilal Mahmood
  - Assemblymember: Matt Haney (D)
  - State senator: Scott Wiener (D)
  - U.S. rep.: Nancy Pelosi (D)

Area
  - Total: 0.036 sq mi (0.093 km^{2})
  - Land: 0.036 sq mi (0.093 km^{2})

Population
  - Total: 1,397
  - Density: 39,000/sq mi (15,000/km^{2})
- Time zone: UTC−8 (Pacific)
  - Summer (DST): UTC−7 (PDT)
- ZIP code: 94115
- Area codes: 415/628

Japantown (Japanese: 日本町, Hepburn: Nihonmachi), also known historically as Japanese Town, is a neighborhood in the Western Addition district of San Francisco, California. Japantown comprises about six city blocks and is considered one of the oldest ethnic enclaves in the United States.

== Location ==
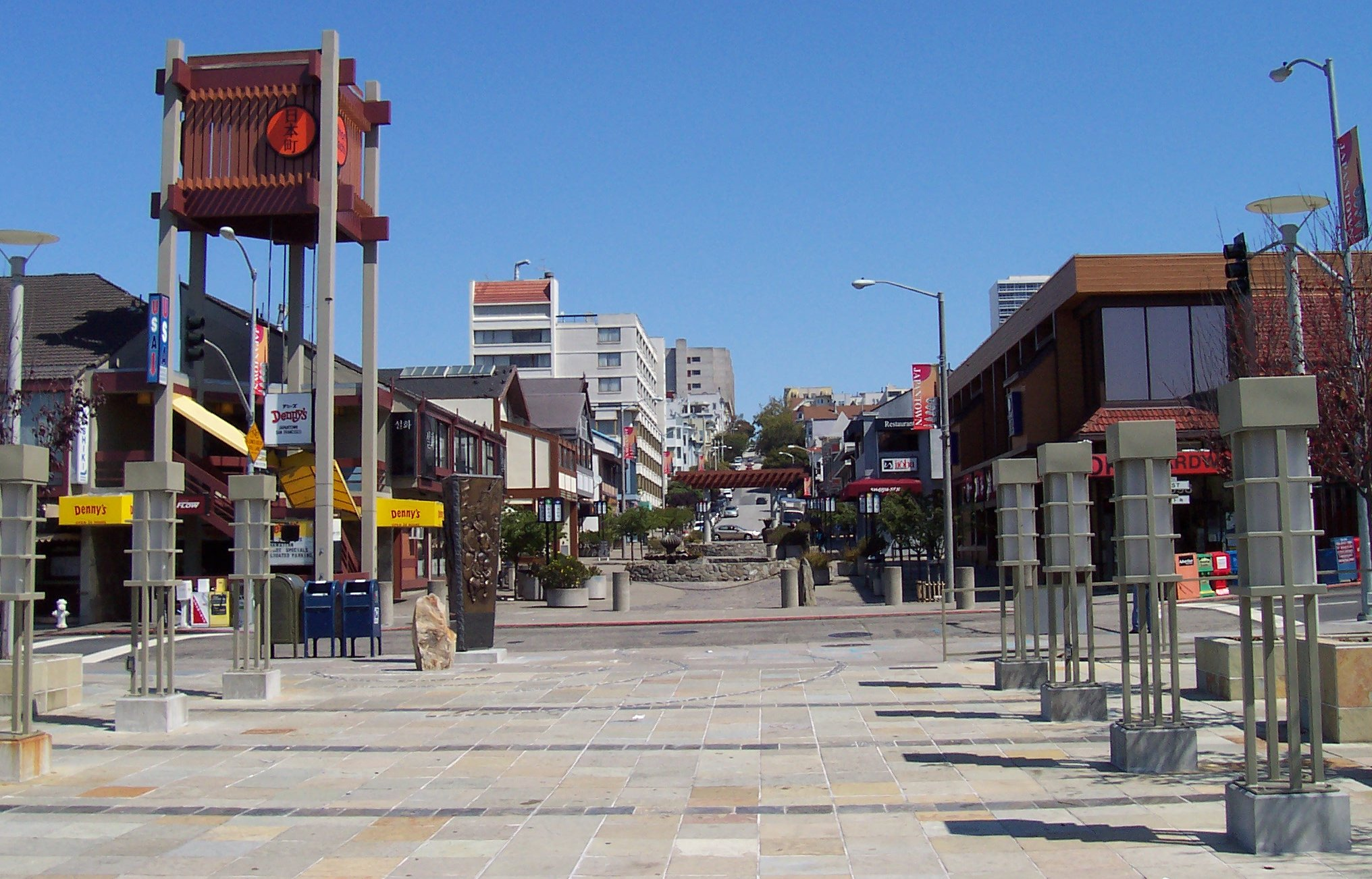
Looking north on Buchanan Street, across Post Street in Japantown.

The main thoroughfare is Post Street, between Fillmore Street (to the west) and Laguna Street (to the east). The Japantown neighborhood is generally considered to be bordered on the north by Bush or Pine Street, and on the south by Geary Boulevard.

Its focal point is the Japan Center, which opened in 1968, and is the site of three Japanese-oriented shopping centers. The San Francisco Peace Pagoda, also at the Japan Center, is a five-tiered concrete stupa designed by Japanese architect Yoshiro Taniguchi and presented to San Francisco by the people of Osaka, Japan.

== History ==
Up until 1906, San Francisco had been the main U.S. port of entry for Asian immigration and had the largest ethnic Japanese concentration of any city in the United States. Prior to the 1906 San Francisco earthquake, San Francisco had two Japantowns, one on the outskirts of Chinatown, the other in the South of Market area. After 1906, Japanese immigrants began moving to San Francisco's Western Addition, which then became San Francisco's main Japantown, with a smaller one in the South Park area. The South Park area was located between the docks used by Japanese shipping companies and the Southern Pacific Railroad Station, and primarily served travelers between Japan and the United States. The South Park district businesses suffered following the passage of the Immigration Act of 1924.

By 1940, the Western Addition Japantown area (referred to as Nihonjin-machi) was one of the largest such enclaves of Japanese outside Japan, as it took an appearance similar to the Ginza district in Tokyo. The ethnic Japanese population numbered over 5,000, and there were more than 200 Japanese-owned businesses.

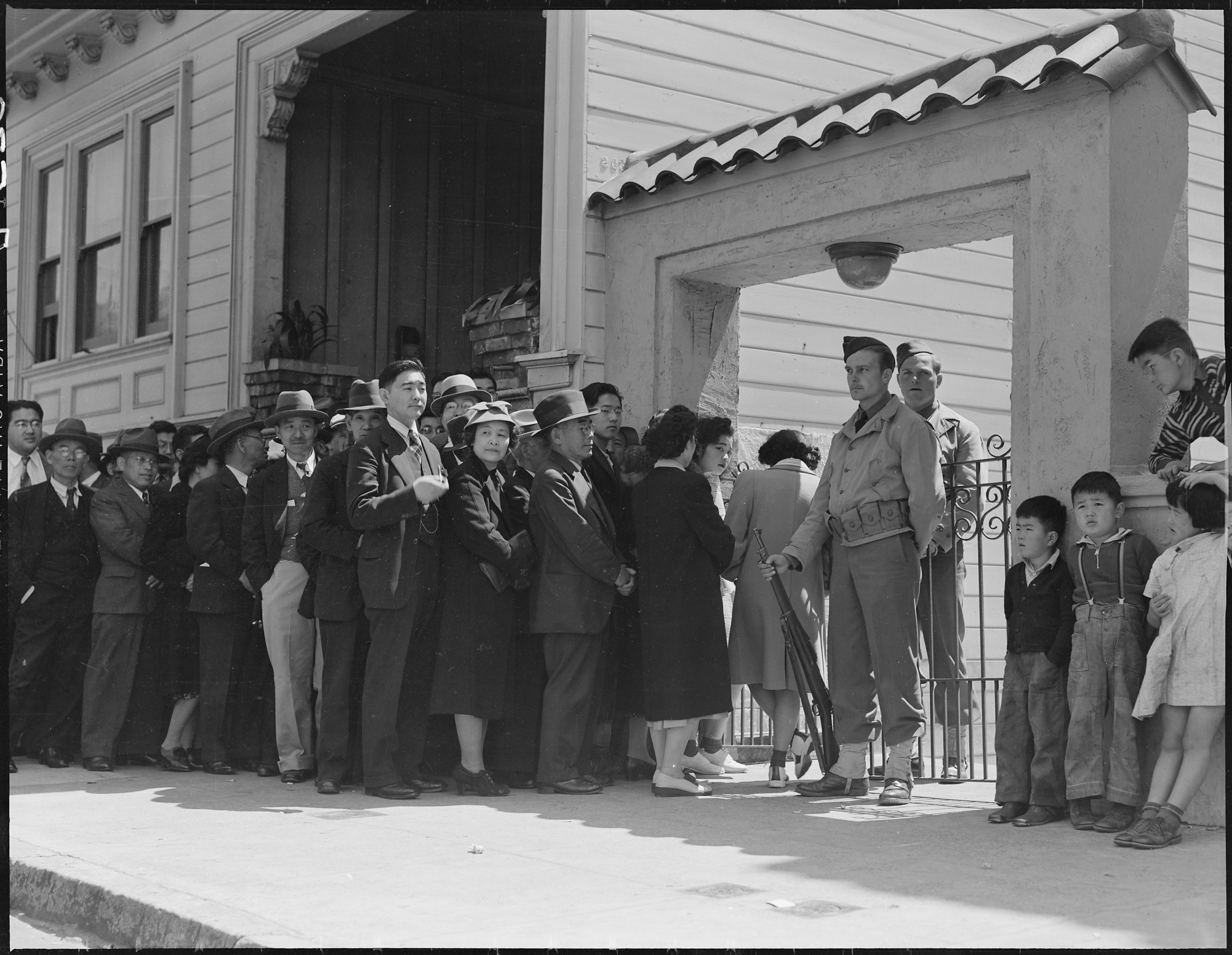
Japantown residents being relocated to Japanese American internment camps in 1942, during World War II.

In February 1942, U.S. President Franklin D. Roosevelt signed Executive Order 9066, which forced all Japanese of birth or descent, including Japanese-American citizens of the United States, to be relocated from the Pacific coast and interned. By 1943 many large sections of the neighborhood remained vacant due to the forced internment. The void was quickly filled by thousands of African Americans who had left the South to find wartime industrial jobs in California as part of the Great Migration.

Following the war, some Japanese Americans returned, followed by new Japanese immigrants as well as investment from the Japanese Government and Japanese companies. However, many former residents did not return to the neighborhood after World War II and instead settled in other parts of the city, or out to the suburbs altogether. Depopulation of Japantown by ethnic Japanese was further instigated by the city's redevelopment plans initiated by M. Justin Herman in the Western Addition in the 1960s through the 1980s. With little community input, existing housing was razed and transportation corridors were widened.

In 1957, San Francisco entered into a sister city relationship with the city of Osaka, hence the nickname "Little Osaka". Osaka was San Francisco's oldest sister city. In commemoration of their 50th anniversary, one block of Buchanan Street in Japantown was renamed Osaka Way on September 8, 2007. However, Osaka ended the 60-year relationship in 2018 after then mayor Ed Lee accepted a statue memorializing comfort women in 2017. The statue is currently erected on public property in San Francisco's Chinatown.

Japantown Bowl was founded in 1976 amidst urban renewal in the Fillmore District, San Francisco in the 1970s. When the building was put up for sale, Supervisor Mabel Teng suggested that the city buy the building if negotiations between private investors failed. The Japanese Cultural and Community Center of Northern California (JCCCNC) offered to buy the building but was rejected. It was the largest of the three remaining bowling alleys in San Francisco when it closed in September 2000. The lot has since been converted into mixed-use housing units.

A pair of cherry blossom trees were planted by the JCCCNC outside of the center in 1994 to commemorate a visit by Emperor Emeritus Akihito and Empress Emerita Michiko of Japan during their 2-week tour of the United States. However, the trees were hacked down over the course of three days by vandals in January 2021.

In 2020 due to the COVID-19 pandemic in the United States, malls in San Francisco were ordered to remain temporarily closed whenever cases got high within the whole city followed by Los Angeles and San Diego. This, in effect, has forced restaurants in the neighborhood, many of whom reside in Japan Center, to turn to a take-out/delivery-only model. The JCCCNC have organized socially distanced outdoor seating and ordering areas in the Peace Plaza. However, some businesses have still remained closed for the duration of the pandemic and have reported losses of 50%.

The five-tiered concrete Peace Pagoda at Japan Center.

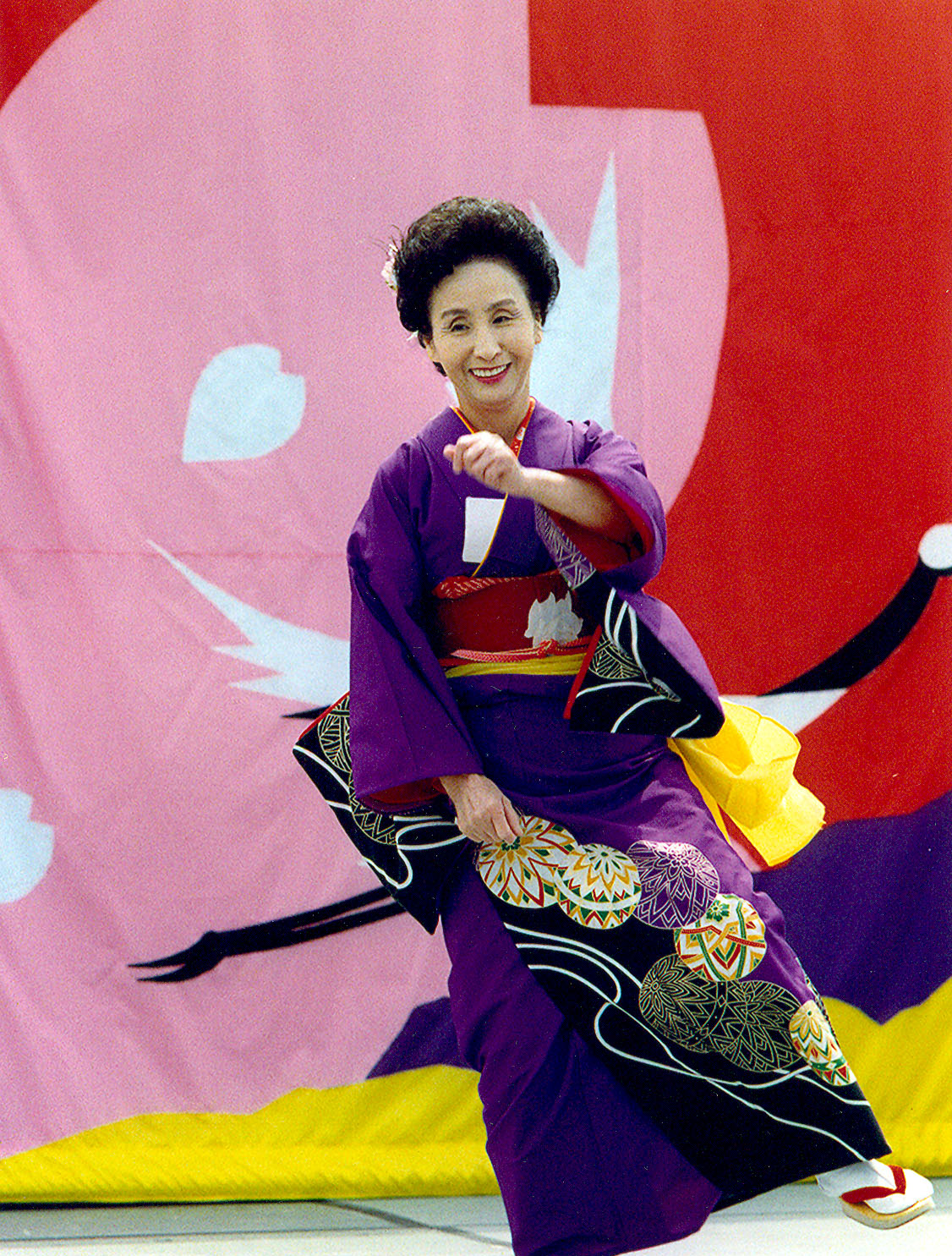
Dancer at the Northern California Cherry Blossom Festival (1990s).

== Attractions and characteristics ==
The area is home to Japanese cuisine restaurants, supermarkets, indoor shopping malls, hotels, banks, and other shops, including one of the few U.S. branches of the large Kinokuniya bookstore chain. Most of these businesses are located in the commercial Japan Center of the neighborhood, in a large shopping mall built in the 1960s as part of urban renewal efforts and is run by Japanese retailer Kintetsu. There is also a number of Korean restaurants here, and also a grocery store, spa, beauty shop, and a household goods store on nearby Fillmore Street.

=== Festivals ===
San Francisco's Japantown celebrates two major festivals every year: The Northern California Cherry Blossom Festival (held for two weekends every April), and the Nihonmachi Street Fair, held one weekend in the month of August.

The Cherry Blossom Festival takes place over the course of two weekends. During the first weekend, the Northern California Cherry Blossom Queen Program takes place at the Kabuki Theatre, where women of Japanese/Japanese-American descent are chosen to represent, learn about, and serve their community. During the Sunday parade, the queen and princesses are presented on a float.

== Government and infrastructure ==
The San Francisco Police Department Northern Station serves Japantown.

=== Education ===
The area is within the San Francisco Unified School District. Rosa Parks Elementary School is located near Japantown. It houses the Japanese Bilingual Bicultural Program (JBBP). In the winter of 2005 Rosa Parks had 245 students, which filled less than half of the school. That winter, SFUSD proposed closing the school and merging it with another elementary school. Parents protested in favor of keeping the school open. SFUSD moved the Japanese Bilingual Bicultural Program into Rosa Parks. As of November 2006, almost half of the students in the regular Rosa Parks program are African-American and one-third of the students in the JBBP program are Japanese.

== Notable buildings ==
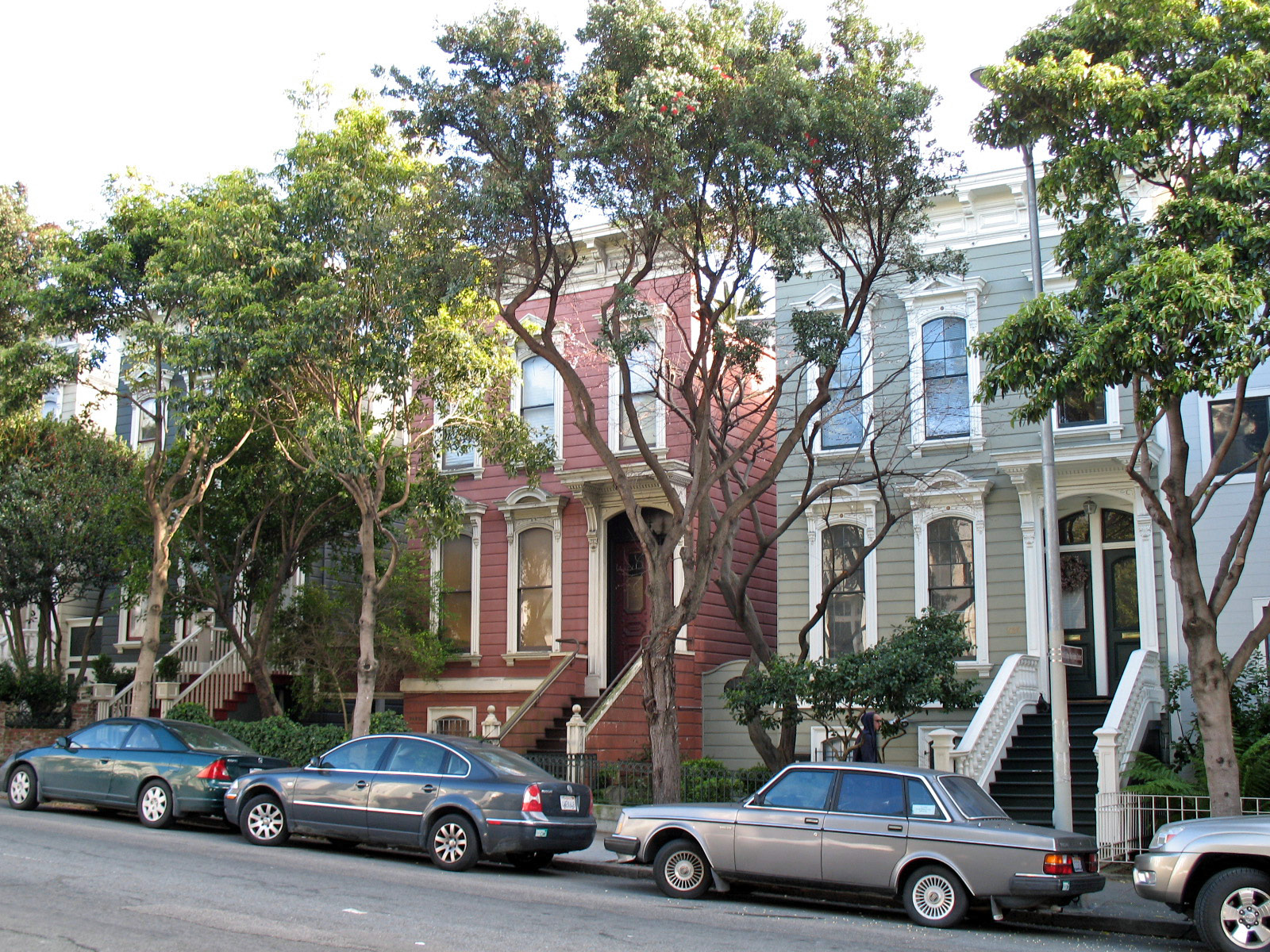
Bush Street–Cottage Row Historic District

Between 1960 until 1980, the San Francisco Redevelopment Agency purchased many Victorian properties, and relocated them within the Western Addition neighborhood (and specifically in Japantown) due to re-zoning. Most of these houses were constructed with local Redwood lumber.

- Building at 1840–1842 Eddy Street, 1840–1842 Eddy Street. Built in 1875, a residential house; listed as a California Historical Landmark, and a National Register of Historic Places listed place.
- Building at 1813–1813B Sutter Street. Built in 1876, a rental house and commercial building; listed as a California Historical Landmark, and a National Register of Historic Places listed place.
- Building at 1735–1737 Webster Street, or Vollmer House, 1735–1737 Webster Street. Built between 1876 and 1885; listed as a California Historical Landmark, and a National Register of Historic Places listed place.
- Bush Street–Cottage Row Historic District, 2101–2125 Bush Street, 1–6 Cottage Row, and 1940–1948 Sutter Street. Comprises 20 historical residences, a walkway and a small park; listed as a San Francisco Designated Landmark, and a National Register of Historic Places listed place.
- Japanese YWCA/Issei Women’s Building, 1830 Sutter Street. Because Japanese women were barred from using the main San Francisco YWCA, this was founded by Issei Japanese women in 1912; listed as a San Francisco Designated Landmark.

== See also ==
- 49-Mile Scenic Drive
- History of the Japanese in San Francisco
- Japanese American internment
- Japanese American National Library
- National Japanese American Historical Society
- Japantown — for other Japanese neighborhoods
- Kinmon Gakuen
- Neighborhoods of San Francisco
