= Western Addition, San Francisco =

Western Addition
- Neighborhood of San Francisco
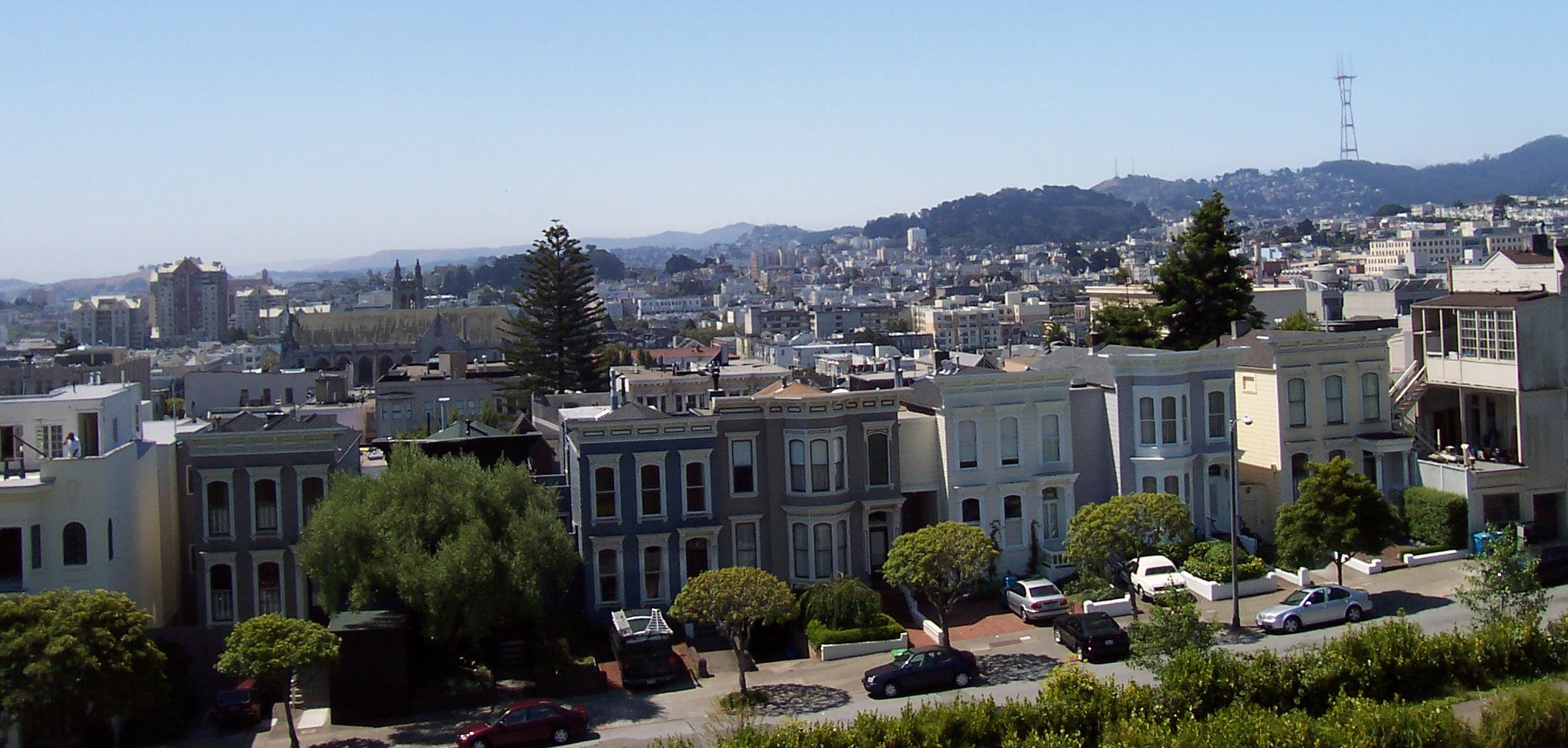
- A southern view from Alta Plaza Park, which is in the Pacific Heights neighborhood. Most of the valley in the central part of this image is in the Western Addition neighborhood.

- Location within Central San Francisco
- Coordinates: 37.782472°N 122.428315°W
- Country: United States
- State: California

Government
  - Supervisor: Bilal Mahmood
  - State Assembly: Matt Haney (D) and Catherine Stefani (D)
  - State Senator: Scott Wiener (D)
  - U. S. Rep.: Nancy Pelosi (D)

Area
  - Total: 0.463 sq mi (1.20 km^{2})
  - Land: 0.463 sq mi (1.20 km^{2})

Population (2008)
  - Total: 12,934
  - Density: 27,919/sq mi (10,780/km^{2})
- ZIP Code: 94102, 94109, 94115, 94117
- Area codes: 415/628

The Western Addition is a name describing an area of what is now central San Francisco. There are two distinct senses of the term. The first, and most widely used today, describes a neighborhood in the west-central part of the city, often treated as more or less synonymous with the Fillmore District.

The second historical sense describes a broad section of the city that was platted in 1850s and consisted of some 500 square blocks. This was an area north of Market Street and Ridley Street (now Duboce Avenue) and west of Larkin Street (the western edge of San Francisco early in the city's history), spanning westward to Divisadero Street, hence the name "Western Addition", because it built out the city westward from the existing urbanized area. In this historical sense, it describes a broad area of San Francisco including neighborhoods like the Pacific Heights that are not considered at all part of the Western Addition today.

The definition of the Western Addition has continued to change through the 20th and 21st centuries as urban renewal plans and gentrification has further subdivided the neighborhood, with enclaves such as the Upper Fillmore (later redesignated "Lower Pacific Heights") and Hayes Valley took on a separate and often more affluent character.

== Location ==
The historic Western Addition subdivided into many smaller neighborhoods such as Lower Pacific Heights, Cathedral Hill, Japantown, the Fillmore, Hayes Valley, Alamo Square, Anza Vista, and North of Panhandle.

The area currently called the Western Addition is located between the neighborhoods of Hayes Valley and the Lower Haight to the south, Lower Pacific Heights to the North, Cathedral Hill to the east, and North of Panhandle and Anza Vista to the west. The approximate boundaries span from the intersection of Geary Boulevard and Divisadero Street in the northwest corner to approximately Gough and McAllister or Fulton Streets on the southwest side, but neighborhood designations and boundaries vary considerably between sources.

== History ==
Historically, the Western Addition was first platted during the 1850s as a result of the Van Ness Ordinance. This large tract encompassed some 500 blocks running west from Larkin Street (the city's previous western boundary) to Divisadero Street, (hence the name "Western Addition") creating Jefferson Square, Hamilton Square, Alamo Square, Alta Plaza, and Lafayette Square. Areas further to the west were designated as the Outside Lands and would not be developed until later in the city's history. The area was initially used for small-scale farming; but, following the invention of the cable car during the 1870s, the Western Addition developed as a Victorian streetcar suburb. It survived the 1906 San Francisco earthquake with its Victorian-style buildings largely intact.

After the Second World War, the Western Addition — particularly the Fillmore District — became a population base and a cultural center for San Francisco's African-American community, a consequence of opportune housing supply due to the internment of Japanese Americans. Since then, urban renewal schemes and San Francisco's changing demographics have led to major changes in the economic and ethnic makeup of the neighborhood, as the Fillmore District suffered from crime and poverty while many other districts underwent significant gentrification. The Central Freeway used to run through the neighborhood to Turk Street, but that section of the freeway was closed immediately after the 1989 Loma Prieta earthquake and later demolished.

Since the early 1990s, the Western Addition has undergone significant gentrification.

== Government and infrastructure ==
The San Francisco Police Department Northern Station serves the Western Addition.

== Notable buildings ==
- Building at 1840–1842 Eddy Street. Built in 1875, a residential house; listed as a California Historical Landmark, and a National Register of Historic Places listed place.
- Building at 1813–1813B Sutter Street. Built in 1876, a rental house and commercial building; listed as a California Historical Landmark, and a National Register of Historic Places listed place.
- Building at 1735-1737 Webster Street. Built between 1876 and 1885; listed as a California Historical Landmark, and a National Register of Historic Places listed place.
- Bush Street–Cottage Row Historic District, 2101–2125 Bush Street, 1–6 Cottage Row, and 1940–1948 Sutter Street. Comprising 20 historical residences, a walkway and a small park; listed as a San Francisco Designated Landmark, and a National Register of Historic Places listed place.
- Goodman Building, 1117 Geary Blvd. Built around 1860, residential hotel and commercial building, formerly an artists coop building.
- Japanese YWCA Building, 1830 Sutter Street. Because Japanese women were barred from using the main San Francisco YWCA, this was founded by Issei Japanese women in 1912; listed as a San Francisco Designated Landmark.
- Stadtmuller House, 819 Eddy Street. Built in 1880, a highly decorated house featuring late 19th-century Italianate architecture; listed as a San Francisco Designated Landmark, a California Historical Landmark, and a National Register of Historic Places listed place.

== See also ==
- Bethel African Methodist Episcopal Church (San Francisco, California)
- Fillmore District
