= Building at 1840–1842 Eddy Street =

Historic house in San Francisco

Coordinates: 37.78075°N 122.43881°W

- U.S. National Register of Historic Places
- California Historical Landmark
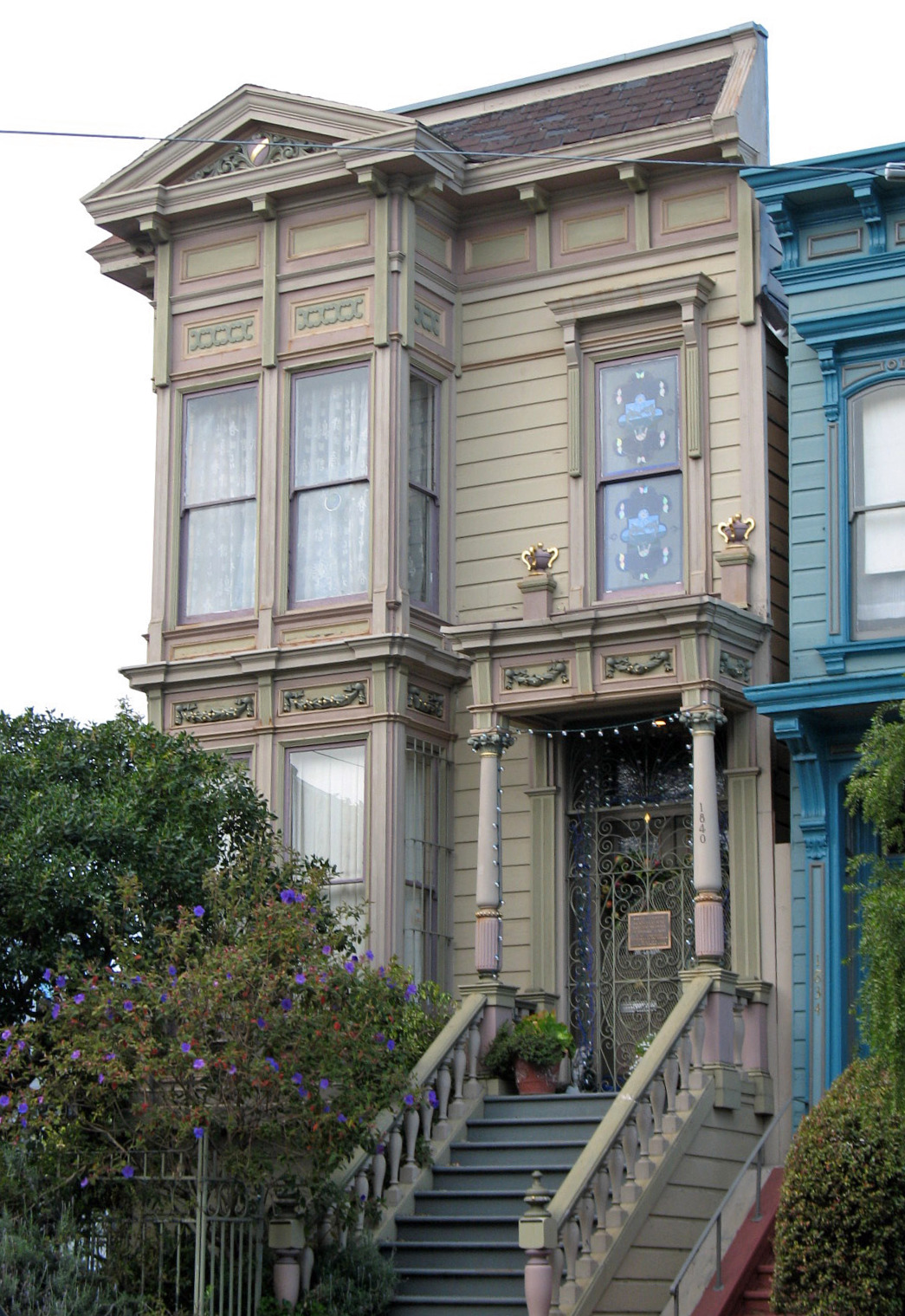

- Location within San Francisco County Location within California
- Location: 1840–1842 Eddy Street, San Francisco, California, 94109, U.S.
- Area: 0.1 acres (0.040 ha)
- Built: 1875
- Architectural style: Stick/Eastlake
- NRHP reference No.: 73000437
- CHISL No.: N208

Significant dates
- Added to NRHP: March 8, 1973
- Designated CHISL: March 8, 1973

The building at 1840–1842 Eddy Street, also known as the Martin O'Dea House, is a historic Stick/Eastlake house built in 1875 in the Western Addition neighborhood of San Francisco, California. It is notable for its architecture. It has been listed as a listed California Historical Landmark since 1973, and was listed on the National Register of Historic Places in 1973.

== History ==
The house was built in 1875 as a narrow two-story wood frame Stick-style house with Eastlake-style ornamentation located at 751 Turk Street in San Francisco. Martin O'Dea, a noted horseshoer from the East Coast was the original building owner, and this property remained in the O'Dea family until purchase was made by the San Francisco Redevelopment Agency in 1972.

During the 1960s though 1980s, the San Francisco Redevelopment Agency moved a handful of Victorian homes within the Nihonmachi (the term used for the historical Japanese community in San Francisco) in order to form the new Japantown, as well as the Japan Center Mall and Geary Street underpass, and this was one of those buildings. In 1973, the building was moved to its current address at Eddy Street.

== See also ==
- California Historical Landmarks in San Francisco County, California
- List of the oldest buildings in California
- National Register of Historic Places listings in San Francisco
