= M. Justin Herman =

American public administrator (1909–1971)

- Born: Meyer Justin Herman; August 4, 1909; New Bedford, Massachusetts, US
- Died: August 30, 1971 (aged 62); San Francisco, California, US
- Other name: Justin Herman
- Education: University of Rochester
- Occupation: Public administrator
- Known for: Head of the San Francisco Redevelopment Agency
- Spouse: Gladys Helen Heinrich (m. 1934–1971)

M. Justin Herman (August 4, 1909 – August 30, 1971) was an American public administrator. From 1951 to 1959, he was head of the regional office of the Housing and Home Finance Agency in San Francisco, California. From 1959 until his death in 1971, he was the Executive Director of the San Francisco Redevelopment Agency. Under his administration, large areas of the city were redeveloped; thousands of residents, many of them poor and non-white, were forced to leave their homes and businesses.

== Early life and education ==
Meyer Justin Herman was born on August 4, 1909, in New Bedford, Massachusetts. His father Samuel Louis Herman owned a dry goods store, and had emigrated in 1891 from Vilna in the Russian Partition. Samuel and his brother Abram were prominent members of New Bedford's Vilnian Jewish community.

Herman attended the University of Rochester and graduated (B.A. 1930) in economics; he was a member of the honor society Phi Beta Kappa. In 1934, he married Gladys Helen Heinrich.

== Career ==
In his early career he worked at Eastman Kodak as an executive trainee in accounting and marketing. In the 1940s, Herman lived in Arlington County, Virginia. During World War II, Herman was a member of the United States Navy.

After the war, he worked for various United States federal agencies. From 1951 to 1959, Herman worked as a San Francisco Bay Area regional administrator for the United States Housing and Home Finance Agency (HHFA).

Herman was appointed executive director of the San Francisco Redevelopment Agency by mayor George Christopher in April 1959. He was an experienced administrator with significant connections in the federal government and an extensive knowledge of urban redevelopment. He had the support of the Bay Area Council, the Blyth-Zellerbach Committee and of the San Francisco Planning and Urban Renewal Association. He greatly expanded the San Francisco Redevelopment Agency from about 60 employees before he took office to 462 shortly after his death.

Herman was responsible for the redevelopment, in two phases, of the Western Addition and for the transformation of Geary Street into Geary Boulevard. In the second phase of the Western Addition project, 10,000 people were displaced and more than 60 city blocks cleared by 1970. The agency also aggressively acquired land in Chinatown, the Golden Gateway, the port area South of Market and the Tenderloin, expropriating poor people from those areas.

Herman died at the age of 62 of a heart attack on August 30, 1971 in San Francisco.

== Reception ==
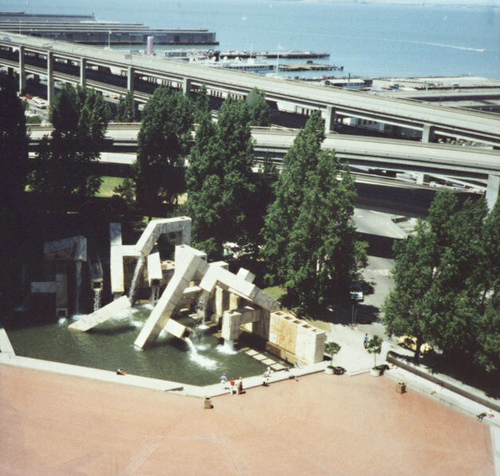
The Embarcadero Plaza (formerly Justin Herman Plaza) in 1988

The National Association of Housing and Redevelopment Officials makes an annual M. Justin Herman Award. Justin Herman Plaza, opposite the Ferry Building in San Francisco, was named for him from 1971 until October 19, 2017.

While Herman's actions were largely supported by the elite of the city and by banks, businesses, and the city government, his reputation among those he displaced from their homes was a very negative one. Sun-Reporter journalist, Thomas C. Fleming described Herman in 1965 as the "arch-villain in the black depopulation of the city", while Reverend Hannibal Williams of the Western Addition Community Organization (WACO) said, "We didn't know who the devil was. But we knew who Justin Herman was and that was the devil for us".

In July 2017, San Francisco Supervisor Aaron Peskin introduced a resolution which would temporarily rename Justin Herman Plaza to Embarcadero Plaza until a new permanent name could be attached, citing Herman's role in displacing poor and minority residents from the Western Addition, Fillmore, Chinatown, and South of Market neighborhoods. The San Francisco Board of Supervisors passed the resolution unanimously on September 19, 2017. The new name would need to be decided by the San Francisco Recreation and Park Commission, which has jurisdiction over naming public spaces. Peskin stated the site's owner, Boston Properties, told him they would cover the cost (estimated at US$5,400 (equivalent to $7,093 in 2025)) of replacing the plaque bearing Herman's name. The plaza is officially known as Embarcadero Plaza.

== See also ==
- Robert Moses
- Modernist architecture
- Federal Power Commission v. Tuscarora Indian Nation
