= Frank R. Fisher =

American jazz trumpeter, arranger and composer (1926–2026)

- Born: Frank Rufus Fisher; October 18, 1926; Huntsville, Texas, U.S.
- Died: August 18, 2026 (aged 99) Richmond, California, U.S.
- Genre: Jazz
- Occupation: Musician
- Instrument: Trumpet

Frank Rufus Fisher (October 18, 1926 – August 18, 2026) was an American jazz trumpeter, arranger and composer. He was one of the oldest jazz musicians in the San Francisco Bay Area still performing.

== Life and career ==
Fisher was a jazz musician in the San Francisco Bay Area. He was involved with music for over 70 years. Fisher was a part of jazz in the Fillmore District, San Francisco, California in the 1940s and 1950s. He has been a member of the Junius Courtney Band since the 1960s.

Fisher died on August 18, 2026, at the age of 99.
