= Building at 1813–1813B Sutter Street =

Historic house in San Francisco

- U.S. National Register of Historic Places
- California Historical Landmark
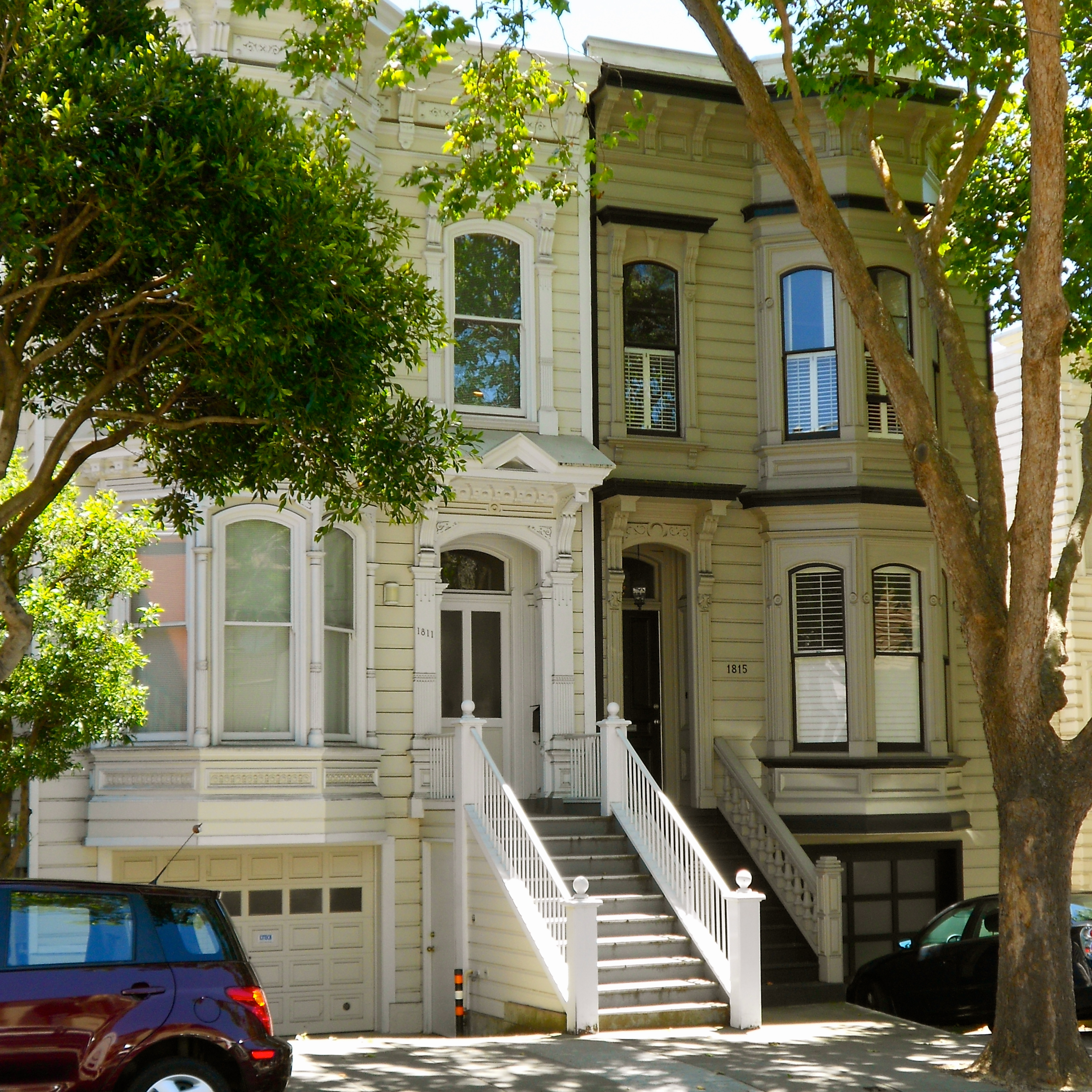

- Location within San Francisco County Location within California
- Location: 1813–1813B Sutter Street, San Francisco, California, 94109, U.S.
- Coordinates: 37°47′10″N 122°25′40″W
- Area: 0.1 acres (0.040 ha)
- Built: 1876
- Architectural style: Italianate
- NRHP reference No.: 73000443
- CHISL No.: N207

Significant dates
- Added to NRHP: March 8, 1973
- Designated CHISL: March 8, 1973

The building at 1813–1813B Sutter Street is a historic Italianate building built in 1876 in the Japantown neighborhood of San Francisco, California. It is notable for its architecture.

The building at 1813–1813B Sutter Street has been listed as a listed California Historical Landmark since 1973; and a National Register of Historic Places listed place since 1973.

== History ==
The building was built in 1876 as a narrow two-story wood frame single family dwelling rental house located at 1624 Post Street in San Francisco (what is now the central area of Japantown). It was initially built and owned by the Gantzer family who lived at 417 Kearny Street. It was later used as a commercial store.

During the 1960s though 1980s, the San Francisco Redevelopment Agency moved a handful of Victorian homes within the Nihonmachi (the older name for the historical Japanese community in San Francisco) in order to form the new Japantown as well as the Japan Center Mall and Geary Street underpass, and this was one of those buildings. It moved to its current location on Sutter Street in 1973.

== See also ==
- California Historical Landmarks in San Francisco County, California
- List of the oldest buildings in California
- National Register of Historic Places listings in San Francisco
