= Japanese YWCA Building =

Historic women's building in Japantown, San Francisco

- Japanese YWCA
- U.S. National Register of Historic Places
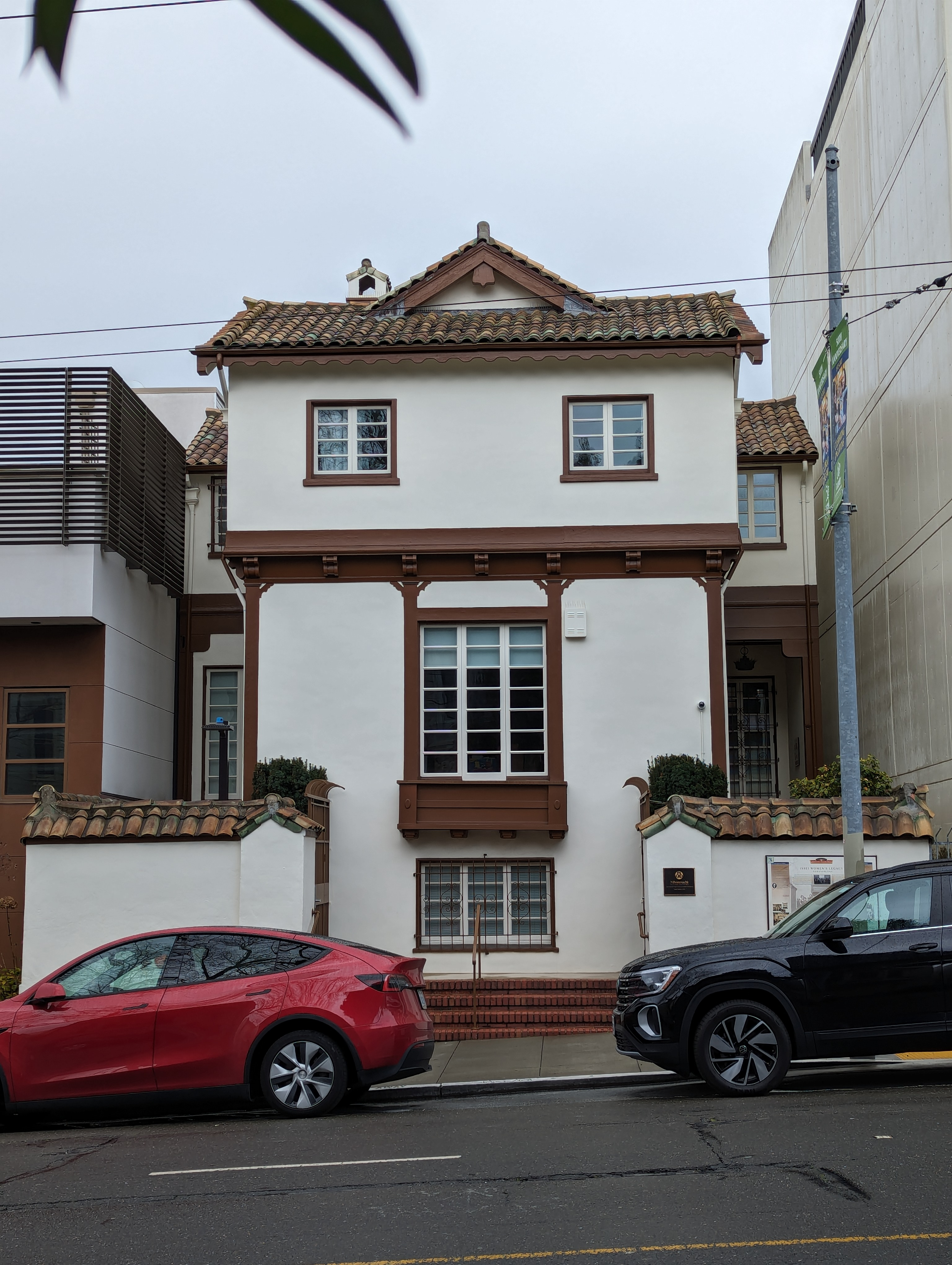
- Original YWCA entrance

- Location within San Francisco County Location within California Location within the United States
- Location: 1830 Sutter Street (formerly numbered 1826); San Francisco, California 94115
- Coordinates: 37°47′12″N 122°25′50″W
- Area: Japantown
- Built: 1932 (original); 2017 (annex)
- Architects: Julia Morgan (original); Tad Sekino (annex)
- Organization: Young Women's Christian Association (YWCA)
- Architectural style: Japanese-Western Eclectic
- NRHP reference No.: 100004868
- Added to NRHP: January 10, 2020

San Francisco Designated Landmark
- Official name: Japanese YWCA/Issei Women's Building
- Designated: April 30, 2021
- Reference no.: 245

The Japanese YWCA Building is a historic structure in Japantown, San Francisco, California. Originally constructed for the a Japanese American chapter of the Young Women's Christian Association, the site later played an important role in the civil rights and LGBTQ rights movements.

Prominent architect Julia Morgan designed the Japanese-inspired building in 1932. Over its history, it also became known as the Issei Women’s Building, San Francisco Friends Center, Western Addition YWCA, and Nihonmachi Little Friends.

== History ==
=== Japanese YWCA ===
The Japanese YWCA began in 1912 to serve first-generation Japanese immigrants, or Issei. At the beginning of the twentieth century, men vastly outnumbered women in the Japanese community. But in 1907, President Theodore Roosevelt established a Gentlemen's Agreement with Japan that sharply curtailed male migration. However, that agreement also allowed the reunion of wives and children with husbands and fathers who were already in the United States. Many of these women were picture brides, who entered into arranged marriages based on photos and letters and met their spouses for the first time in America. It was within this context that Yonako (Yona) Abiko founded the Japanese YWCA.

Japanese women were barred from using the YWCA's whites only facilities so they established their own, which became the first independent Japanese YWCA in the United States. Initially renting space in a hotel, the group continued to grow and needed their own building. However, the Alien Land Law prevented Asian immigrants from owning property so, as a workaround, the San Francisco YWCA purchased and held the property in trust using funds raised from the Japanese community. Julia Morgan, the first female architect in California, designed the building pro bono. The new facility opened in 1932 and became part of a cluster of services supporting immigrants in Japantown.

The YWCA served dual functions of integrating Japanese women into American society while celebrating Japanese culture in their new country. So the group held activities common at other YWCA chapters including hosting dances, offering free health screenings, placing women in jobs, and holding an annual fundraiser to send girls to summer camp at Asilomar. But the organization also supported Japanese culture by holding tea ceremonies, putting on an exhibit about Hinamatsuri at the De Young Museum, presenting a flower arranging demonstration at the St. Francis Hotel, and by welcoming YWCA guests from Japan.

In 1941, the Japanese Empire attacked Pearl Harbor, bringing the United States into World War II. The following year, President Franklin D. Roosevelt issued Executive Order 9066 requiring the evacuation from the West Coast of residents of Japanese ancestry, most of whom were American citizens. With the entire local population removed to internment camps, the Japanese YWCA closed in 1942.

After the war, the Japanese YWCA could not be re-established due to the YWCA's new integration policies which now forbade single-race chapters. In any case, the Japanese American population became increasingly dispersed throughout the Bay Area due to a combination of neighborhood redevelopment and suburbanization, although Japantown remained a cultural center.

=== American Friends Service Committee ===
The YWCA leased the site to the American Friends Service Committee (AFSC) beginning in 1943. The Quaker group renamed the facility to the San Francisco Friends Center which offered aid to refugees, supported conscientious objectors, and helped Japanese American students to transfer to colleges outside of the West Coast.

The AFSC also offered office and meeting space to other human rights organizations. The San Francisco chapter of the Congress of Racial Equality (CORE), a civil rights group, maintained their headquarters at the center beginning in 1943. Bayard Rustin, a gay African American civil rights leader with CORE, taught civil disobedience classes, led protests against segregation, and visited the Manzanar Internment Camp. During this period, he helped refine the pacifist strategies later used by the broader Civil Rights Movement.

The Mattachine Society, an early gay and lesbian rights organization, held its first convention here in 1954. While the homophile movement previously held private cloistered discussions, it dared to meet in a public setting for the first time in the Peace Center's auditorium.

After the AFSC departed in 1959, the San Francisco YWCA used it as a non-ethnic branch named the Western Addition YWCA

=== Nihonmachi Little Friends ===
New Nihonmachi Little Friends entrance

Founded in 1975, the Nihonmachi Little Friends center offers bilingual Japanese and English childcare. The school focuses on project-based learning to develop inquiry in students. The childcare center originally rented space from the Kinmon Gakuen language school in Japantown but began renting space from the YWCA in 1985.

In 1996, the YWCA of San Francisco listed the old Japanese YWCA Building for sale as surplus property. A coalition of local Japanese Christian churches called Soko Bukai, who founded the original YWCA, sued. The group asserted that the YWCA was a trustee of the building on behalf of the Japanese women who were not allowed to legally own the property because of racist property laws. In 2002, the groups settled and the Nihonmachi Little Friends purchased the building for an undisclosed sum.

In 2017, the Nihonmachi Little Friends expanded and added an annex to the building. The addition includes a rooftop play area and enables the school to become ADA-accessible with a bank of elevators.

== Architecture ==
The original 1932 building consists of a two-story-over-raised-basement wood-framed structure designed in an eclectic Japanese-inspired design. The exterior uses light stucco cladding contrasting with dark wooden pilasters, casement windows, planter boxes, and corbelled brackets. On top are complex front-gable, cross-gable, and flat rooflines made with barrel tiles. In front, a small wall uses the same stucco and tile.

The interior included a dorm, meeting rooms, and an auditorium with an authentic Noh theater stage to perform classical Japanese dramas—the only one in the western United States. The distinctive building provided a sense of cultural identity to the local Japanese community.

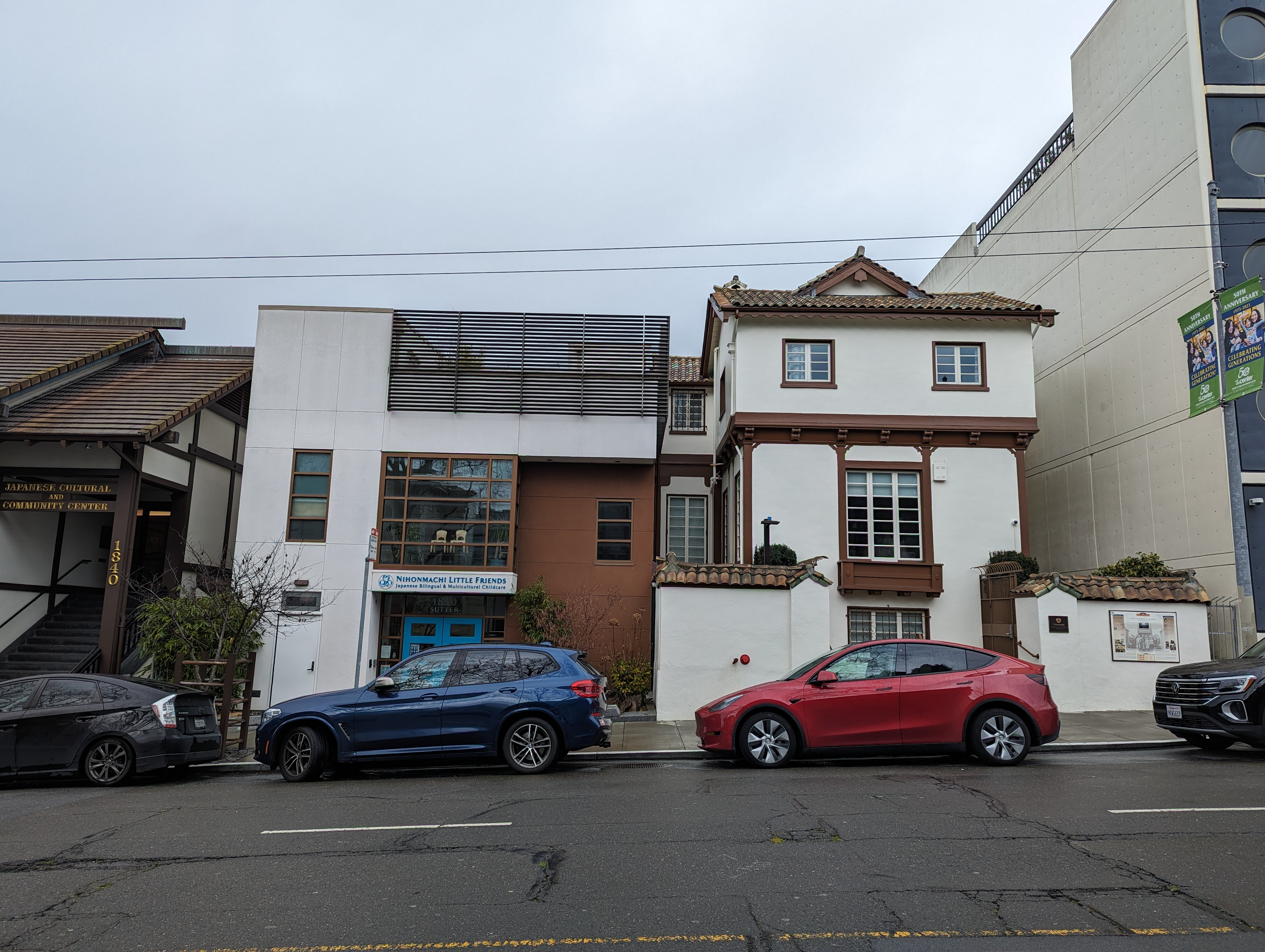
Left to right: Japanese Culture and Community Center, 2017 annex, and 1932 original building

Architect Julia Morgan donated her designs for the building. She designed more than 30 YWCA builidngs including the one in San Francisco's Chinatown. But Morgan took a reputational risk working directly with unpopular Japanese clients. She may have felt sympathetic to the community based on her own experiences of hostility in a male-dominated architecture profession. She also had a long-term friendly relationship with her Japanese American housekeeper, Sachi Oka.

The 2017 annex built for the Nihonmachi Little Friends sits on the west side of the building. Tad Sekino with HKIT Architects of Oakland also designed the addition in a Japanese style. But Sekino deliberately designed a simple facade so as not to visually distract from either the original Morgan building or the Japanese Culture and Community Center on the other side.

The Japanese YWCA Building survives as one of the few cultural buildings in Japantown that predates the internment period. The National Register of Historic Places listed the building in 2020, as did the California Register of Historical Resources Becoming a San Francisco Designated Landmark followed in 2021.

== See also ==
- List of YWCA buildings
- List of works by Julia Morgan
- LGBTQ culture in San Francisco
- List of San Francisco Designated Landmarks
- National Register of Historic Places listings in San Francisco
