= Bush Street–Cottage Row Historic District =

- U.S. National Register of Historic Places
- U.S. Historic district
- California Historical Landmark
- San Francisco Designated Landmark
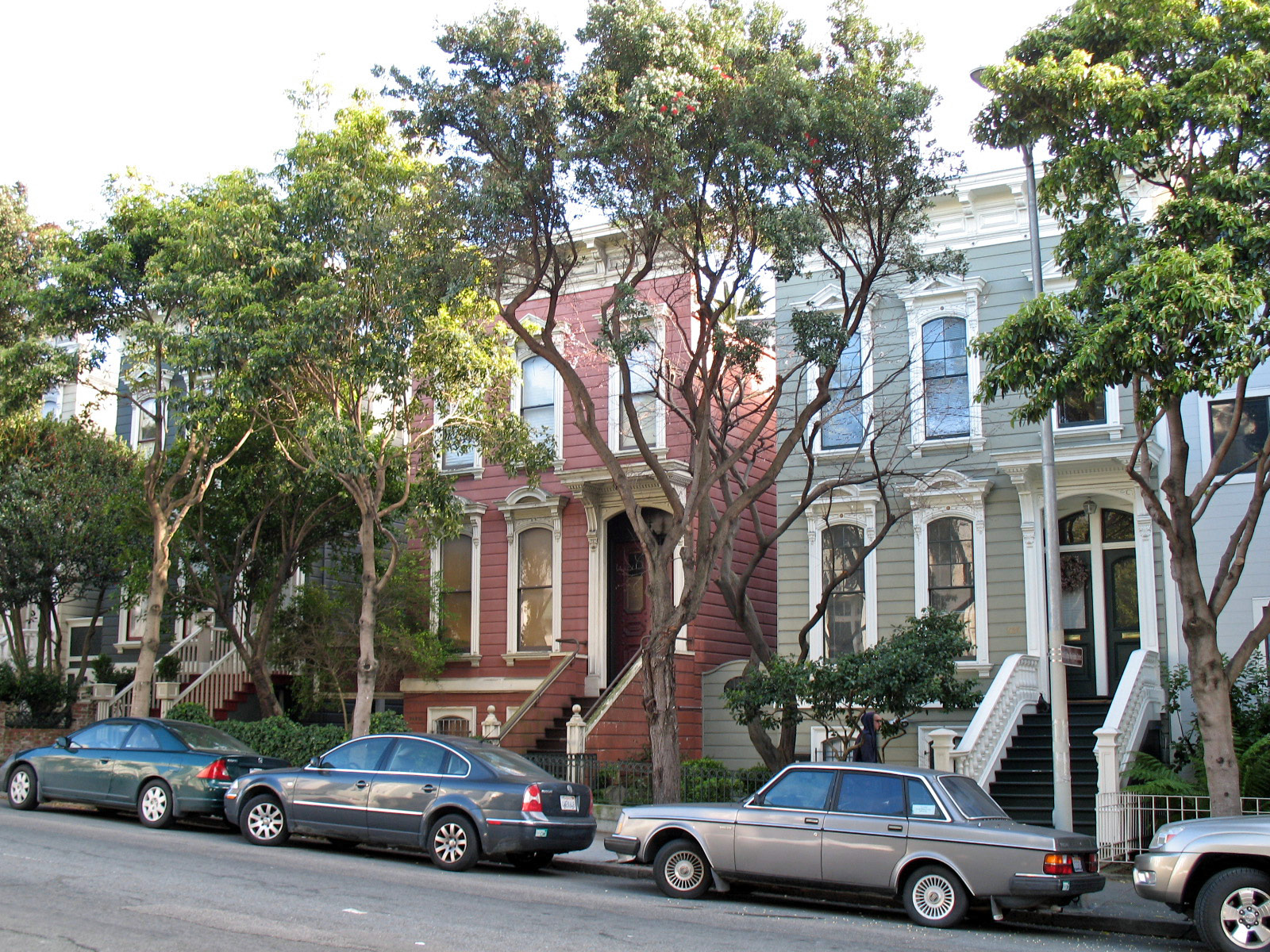

- Location within San Francisco County Location within California
- Location: 2101-2125 Bush Street., 1-6 Cottage Row, and 1940-1948 Sutter Street, San Francisco, California
- Coordinates: 37°47′12″N 122°25′52″W
- Area: 1.2 acres (0.49 ha)
- Built by: C. L. Taylor; The Real Estate Association
- Architectural style: Stick/Eastlake, Italianate
- NRHP reference No.: 82000983
- CHISL No.: N1167
- SFDL No.: 9

Significant dates
- Added to NRHP: December 27, 1982
- Designated CHISL: December 27, 1982
- Designated SFDL: September 1991

The Bush Street–Cottage Row Historic District is a historic district located in the Japantown area of San Francisco, California, U.S.. The area is a residential enclave comprising 20 historical residences, a walkway, and a small park. It is listed as a San Francisco Designated Landmark since September 1991, under the name " Bush Street–Cottage Row"; listed as a listed California Historical Landmark since December 27, 1982; and listed on the National Register of Historic Places on December 27, 1982, for architecture.

== History ==
The Bush Street–Cottage Row District is an intact, century-old enclave within San Francisco's mostly bulldozed Western Addition Redevelopment (area 2) by the San Francisco Redevelopment Agency.

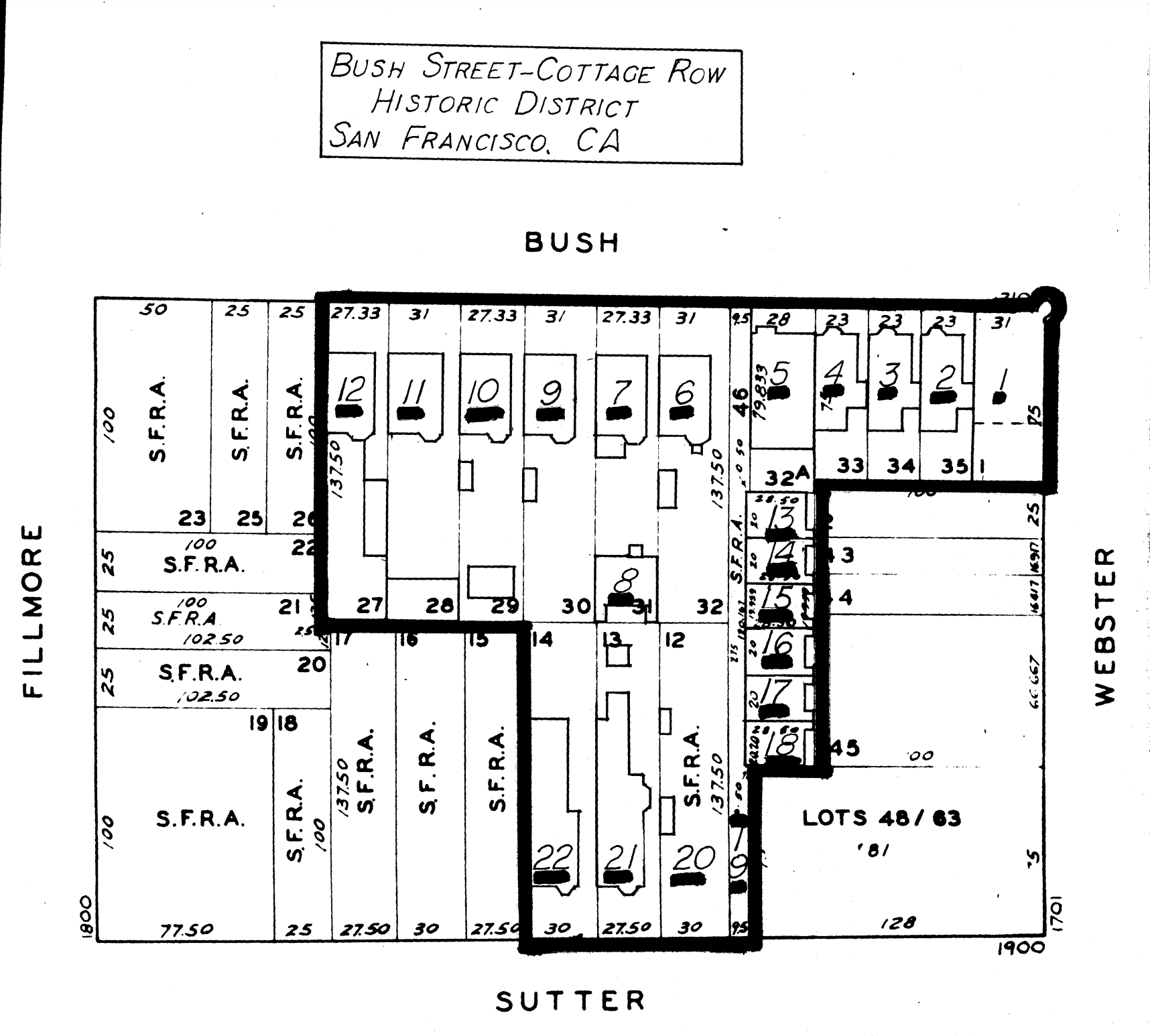
Bush Street–Cottage Row Historic District map

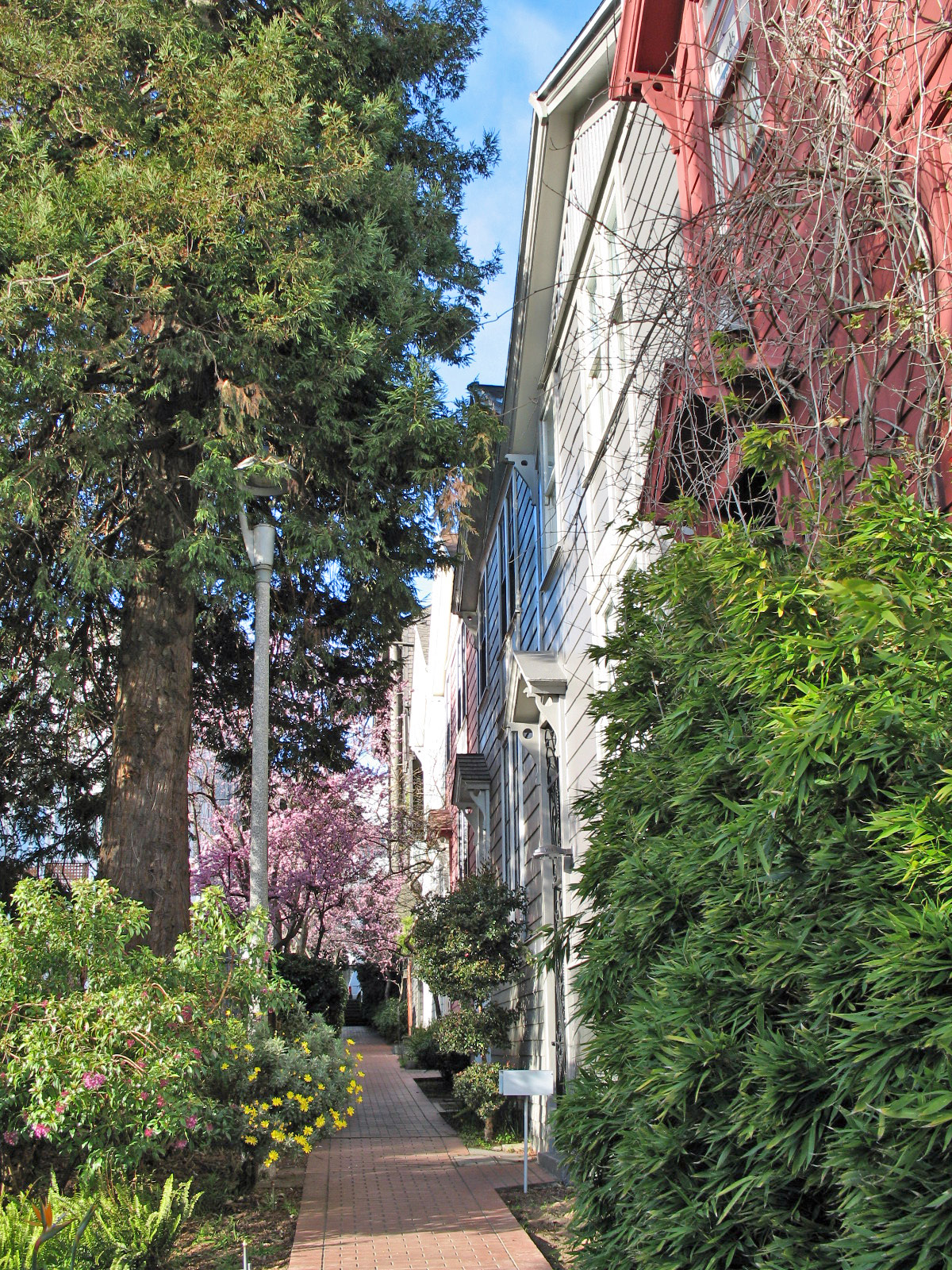
View from Cottage Row, San Francisco, California

Almost all the houses were developed in four groups, so that six houses on Bush Street are essentially identical to each other, as are three different ones on Bush Street, two on Sutter Street and six on Cottage Row. All these are two-story frame structures of Italianate style or early Stick style.

The Real Estate Associates (TREA), San Francisco's largest residential housing developer of the 1870s, built 2115–2125 Bush Street and 1942–1948 Sutter Street. In the 1870s TREA built over 1,000 houses, usually in developments similar to this one in San Francisco's Mission District, Western Addition and Pacific Heights, It catered to the working class, appealing to a mass market with easy credit and plentiful advertising. The president of TREA was William Hollis (1839–1895) had come to California in 1852 from Missouri. In September 1874, the TREA company had bought the whole block west of what is now Cottage Row for $25,250 and, following their usual practice, had subdivided the land into 23 lots. They sold the subdivision lots and houses for US$14,200 to $6,623 from January 16 to August 28, 1875.

Col. Charles L. Taylor (1826–?) was another real estate developer involved with the development of some of the Bush Street–Cottage Row houses, he was originally from Maine. In 1874, Taylor built 2101–2107 Bush Street; and again in 1882, he built 2109–2111 Bush and 1-6 Cottage Row. The residences built by Taylor were designed by the architecture firm of Taylor and Copeland, featuring architect Frederick L. Taylor (of no relation to Charles). After they were built, Taylor held the homes as rentals for around 12 years.

In the 1930s, Cottage Row was nicknamed "Japan Street" because the houses all had owners were Japanese-American or had immigrated from Japan. The Cottage Row Mini Park had been the former site of a house and was developed into a park around 1942, and features benches, a drinking fountain, a barbecue.

In modern day, each house is now individually owned.

== See also ==
- List of San Francisco Designated Landmarks
- California Historical Landmarks in San Francisco County, California
- National Register of Historic Places listings in San Francisco
