= San Francisco Redevelopment Agency =

San Francisco city agency from 1948 to 2012

Agency overview
- Formed: August 10, 1948
- Dissolved: February 1, 2012
- Superseding agency: San Francisco Office of Community Investment and Infrastructure
- Jurisdiction: City and County of San Francisco

The San Francisco Redevelopment Agency (SFRA) was an urban renewal agency active from 1948 until 2012, with purpose to improve the urban landscape through "redesign, redevelopment, and rehabilitation" of specific areas of the city.

SFRA demolished over 14,000 housing units in San Francisco between 1948 and 1976, claiming the agency was working on slum clearance and addressing urban "blight". It replaced the demolished units with newly built affordable housing, but was only able to replace a portion. It was succeeded by the San Francisco Office of Community Investment and Infrastructure (OCII).

== History ==
On August 10, 1948, the San Francisco Redevelopment Agency was formed under the California Community Redevelopment Law of 1945, and in response to the Housing Act of 1937. Initially the agency was not a separate department, but rather the functions were carried out by various city departments; however by 1950, the organization formed its own city department. The first agency chairman in 1948 was Morgan Arthur Gunst; who had previously worked for the San Francisco Planning Commission.

In 1954, real estate promoter Ben Swig presented the San Francisco Prosperity Plan which involved a complete overhaul of the south of Market street (SOMA), a project that the city approved in 1966. Primary work started on the Moscone Center project.

In 1955, Joseph Alioto was appointed chairman of the board of the SFRA. He led the Western Addition redevelopment project, which was criticized because a vast majority of its previous residents could not move back as rents had gotten much higher.

In 1969, residents of the SOMA created the Tenant and Owners in Opposition to Redevelopment (TOOR) which charged the SFRA for not fulfilling its promise of finding affordable housing for removed residents. The case was brought up all the way to the Federal District Court which ruled in favor of the TOOR in a unique moment in History where a federal judge refuted the HUD. In 1970, Justin Herman, executive director of the SFRA, said about the SOMA "This land is too valuable to permit poor people to park on it." Efforts of the TOOR to protect the removed residents were finally diluted by the SFRA.

From 1989 until 2011, the agency used tax increment financing as a major source of their funding (through a TIF law); which prompted the Mayor and the Board of Supervisors initiated a policy requiring that half of the agency's tax increment financing be used towards affordable housing in San Francisco.

The agency had removed 14,207 housing units between 1948 and 1978. They started a process of replacing the units with affordable housing; and by 2012, the agency had created 7,498 affordable units (a net loss of 6,709).

The agency was dissolved on February 1, 2012; in response to the Supreme Court of California decision issued on December 29, 2011, in the case, California Redevelopment Association et al. v. Ana Matosantos. The City and County of San Francisco created the Office of Community Investment and Infrastructure (OCII) as the successor agency.

== Agency leadership ==
- Morgan Arthur Gunst, the first Chairman, from 1948 to 1953
- James E. Lash, Executive Director
- Sydney Grant Walton, Vice Chairman
- Joseph Alioto, Chairman, from 1955 to 1959
- M. Justin Herman, Executive Director, April 1959 to August 1971
- Robert Rumsey, Executive Director, 1971 to 1974
- Wilbur Wyatt Hamilton, Executive Director, 1977 to 1987
- LeRoy King, Commissioner, 1980 to 2011
- Fred Blackwell, Executive Director, 2007 to 2011
- Tiffany Bohee, Interim Executive Director, 2012

== Projects ==
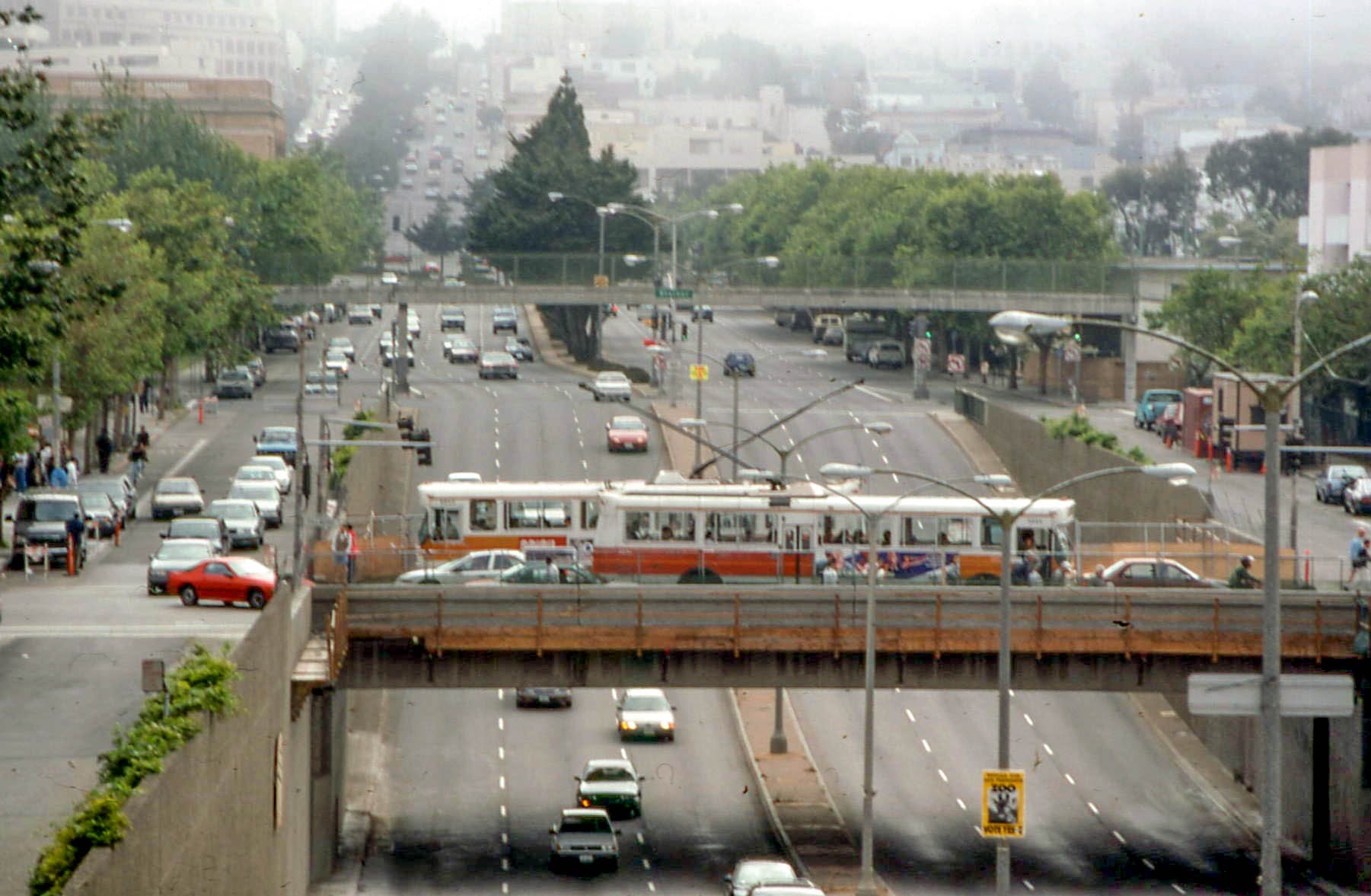
Geary Street underpass in Western Addition

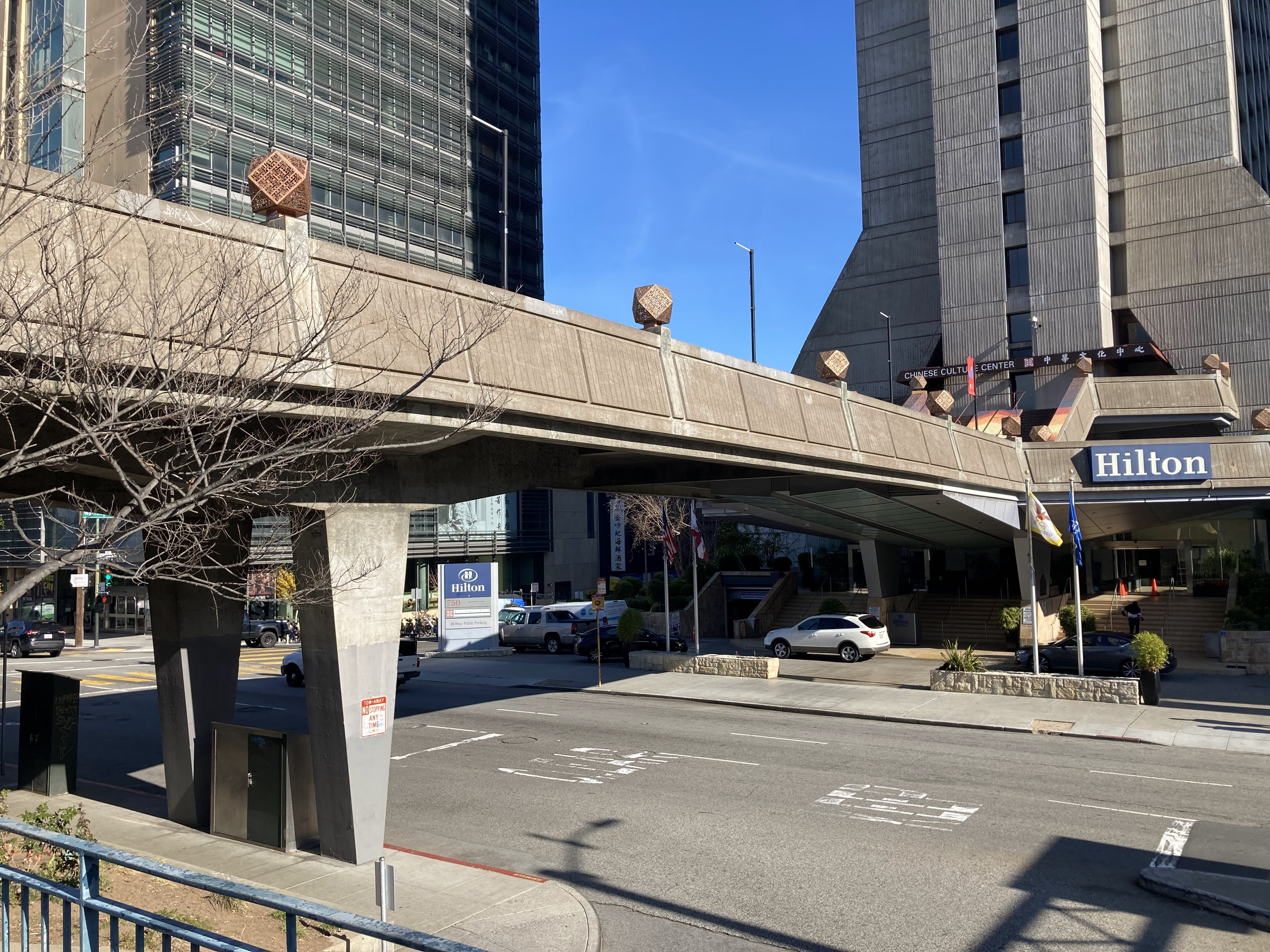
Portsmouth Square pedestrian bridge in Chinatown

=== Western Addition ===
During the internment of Japanese Americans during World War II, the city had a surplus of buildings in Japantown. The SFRA took this as an opportunity for urban renewal to create the new Western Addition neighborhood — particularly the formation of the Fillmore District into an African American area. The creation of the Geary Street underpass was part of the project.

By the 1970s, the San Francisco Redevelopment Agency had forced out 50,000 African Americans from the Fillmore District in order to build new housing and new commercial buildings. They had bulldozed the neighborhood but then left empty lots for some 30 years, destroying the once vibrant black community.

In 2007, the SFRA built the "Fillmore Heritage Center" which included commercial spaces, black-owned apartments, a jazz club, and a theater space; but 10 years later most of the black community was forced out again because of the cost of living and gentrification.

== List of projects ==
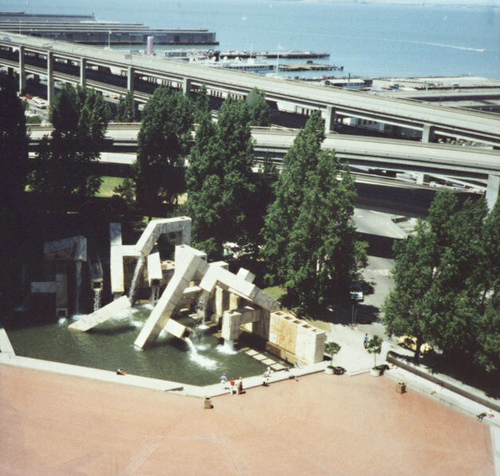
The Embarcadero Plaza (formerly Justin Herman Plaza) in 1988

- Diamond Heights neighborhood, active from 1948 to 1978.
- Western Addition (including the Fillmore District), active from 1948 until January 2009: 883 businesses shut down, 4,729 households emptied, 2,500 Victorian homes demolished. Yet, in 60 years, the agency failed to revive the once vibrant Black-American neighborhood.
- Golden Gateway, also known as Embarcadero-Lower Market, a former produce terminal area turned into a 17-block area of downtown, started in the 1950s, contains Sydney Walton Square
- Yerba Buena Center (different from Yerba Buena Center for the Arts), an 87-acre project, active from 1966 to 2009.
- Butchertown, now known as India Basin, a former meat processing-area turned into industrial redevelopment, started in 1968
- Hunters Point Naval Shipyard, active from 1969 until 2009.
- Rincon and South Beach, active from 1970 to 1988
- South of Market, the 6th Street corridor, started after the 1989 earthquake
- Mission Bay, active from 2002
- Treasure Island
- Visitacion Valley
- Transbay Transit Center

== Reception ==
The agency was supported by elite of the city and by banks, businesses and the city government. The intent was to encourage the development in the city to include partnership with private investors.

However, from the moment the agency was formed, there was vocal criticism and opposition from the African American community. The agency's policies caused thousands of residents, many of them poor and non-white, were forced to leave their homes and businesses.

== See also ==
- Slum clearance in the United States
- Subsidized housing in the United States
- San Francisco Planning and Urban Research Association
- San Jose Redevelopment Agency
