= Fillmore District, San Francisco =

Fillmore District
- Neighborhood
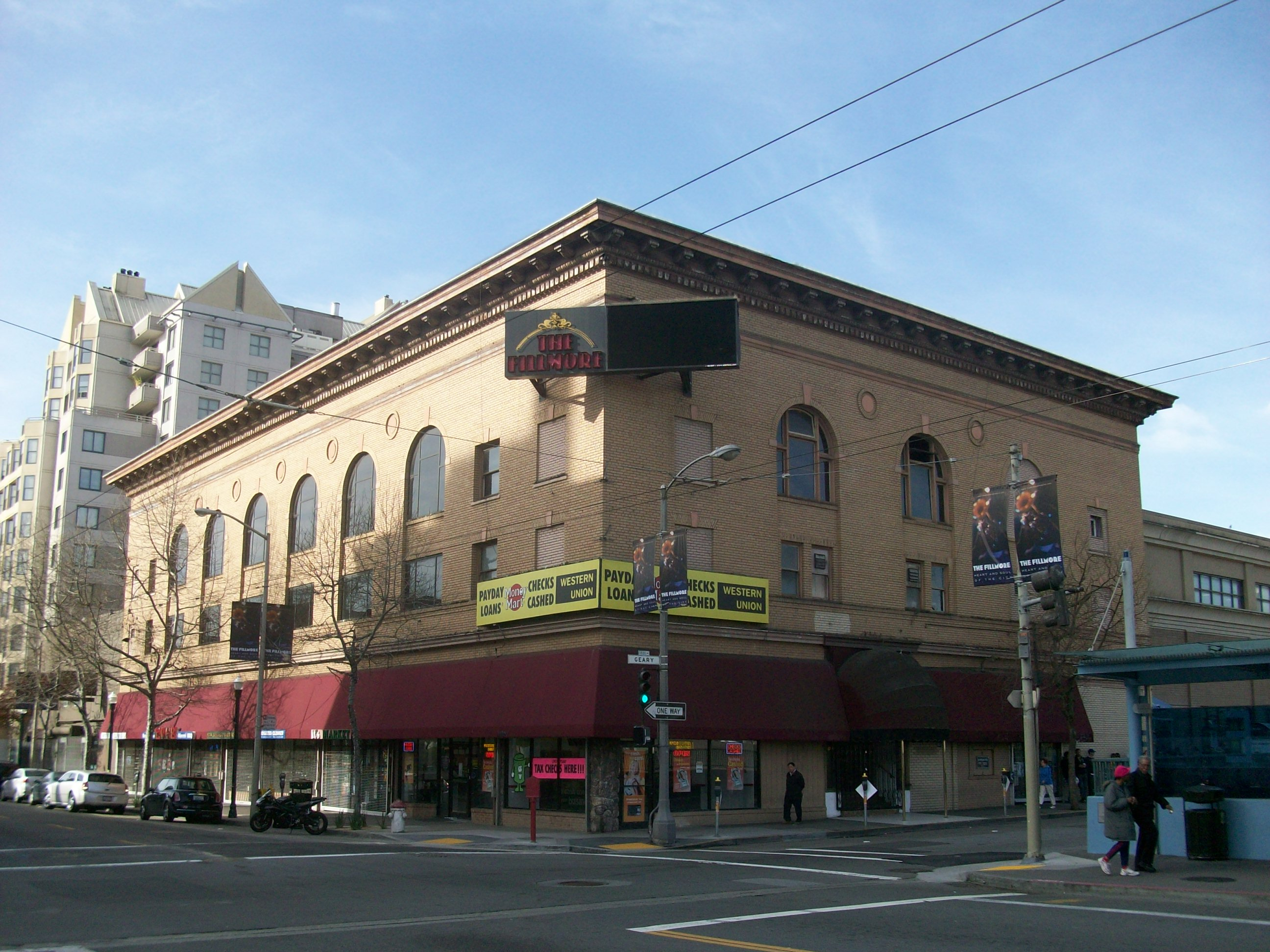
- The Fillmore Auditorium on Fillmore and Geary
- Nicknames: The Fillmore, The Moe, Fillmoe, The FeeMoe, Filthy Moe, The Mighty Westside, Harlem of the West
- Location within Central San Francisco
- Coordinates: 37.7805°N 122.4322°W
- Country: United States
- State: California
- City and county: San Francisco
- Named for: Fillmore Street and Millard Fillmore

Government
  - Supervisor: Bilal Mahmood
  - Assemblymember: Matt Haney (D)
  - State senator: Scott Wiener (D)
  - U. S. rep.: Nancy Pelosi (D)

Area
  - Total: 0.463 sq mi (1.20 km^{2})
  - Land: 0.463 sq mi (1.20 km^{2})

Population (2008)
  - Total: 12,934
  - Density: 27,919/sq mi (10,780/km^{2})
- Time zone: UTC-8 (Pacific)
  - Summer (DST): UTC-7 (PDT)
- ZIP codes: 94102, 94109, 94115, 94117
- Area codes: 415/628

The Fillmore District is a historical neighborhood in San Francisco. Definitions vary, but it is generally treated as either a synonym or subneighborhood of the Western Addition and is centered on the strip of Fillmore Street south of Geary Boulevard to about McAllister or Fulton Street. It is situated to the north of the Hayes Valley and Lower Haight and south of the Upper Fillmore.

The Fillmore District began to rise to prominence after the 1906 San Francisco earthquake. As a result of not being affected by the earthquake itself nor the large fires that ensued, it quickly became one of the major commercial and cultural centers of the city.

After the earthquake, the district experienced a large influx of diverse ethnic populations as other neighborhoods in San Francisco would not allow non-whites to move there. It began to house large numbers of African Americans, Japanese and Jews. Each group significantly contributed to the local culture and earned the Fillmore district a reputation for being "One of the most diverse neighborhoods in San Francisco". In particular, the district was known for having the largest jazz scene on the west coast of the United States up until its decline in the 1970s. A large Japantown was also historically located in the Fillmore District although technically it does not lie within the borders of the district today.

During the late 1960s and 1970s, city leaders campaigned for "Urban Renewal" with plans centering around the Fillmore District. The forced removal of African American residents led to a decline of the jazz scene in the area. However, there are claims that jazz in the district has rebounded in recent years.

The redevelopment of the Fillmore remains a controversial issue. Many of those forced to move from the district call that redevelopment a "Negro Removal" and a product of racism. The city planners claim redevelopment was a way to combat the extremely high rates of crime in the area and to reinvigorate the local economy.

== Location ==
Though its boundaries are not clearly defined, the Fillmore is usually considered to be a subset of the Western Addition neighborhood and is roughly bordered by Van Ness Avenue on the east, Divisadero Street on the west, Geary Boulevard on the north, and Grove Street on the south. These delineations are approximate and there are certain irregularities in the geographic shape of the neighborhood; for instance, the Westside Housing Projects are generally considered to be part of the Fillmore District, even though they are located a block west of Divisadero and a block north of Geary. The community also extends south of Grove St. at several points. Fillmore Street, from which the district gets its name, is the main north–south thoroughfare running through the center of the district.

The area east of Fillmore Street is locally referred to as Downtown Fillmore, while the area to the west of Fillmore is known by many locals as Uptown Fillmore. Some definitions, particularly older ones, include Hayes Valley, Japantown, and what is now known as North of Panhandle as part of the district and extend the western border further. However, redevelopment — for example, that which followed the Loma Prieta earthquake and the collapse of the Central Freeway — has made these areas more independent and distinct. In addition, the area centered on Fillmore Street to the north of Geary had long been uniformly known as Upper Fillmore, but rising property values in the 1980s and 1990s severely weakened its ties to the largely working-class Fillmore District. Instead, it became increasingly tied to the extremely wealthy Pacific Heights neighborhood to the north. This change in socio-economic identity has caused the Upper Fillmore to be commonly called "Lower Pacific Heights" in recent times, especially by its non-native residents. Overall, most locals agree that the Fillmore has been steadily shrinking for several decades. The Fillmore is almost entirely in San Francisco's fifth supervisorial district, with a small sliver on the district's eastern edge in District 3.

== History ==
The Fillmore district was created in the 1880s to provide new space for the city to grow in an effort to address overcrowding. After the 1906 earthquake Fillmore Street, which had largely avoided heavy damage, temporarily became a major commercial center as the city's downtown rebuilt and began a period where the district where migrant groups from Jews to Japanese and then African-Americans predominated. Redevelopment programs in the 1960s led to displacement and loss of the district's jazz and cultural scene.

=== Jewish community ===
After the 1906 earthquake, Jewish emigrants from Eastern Europe and those displaced from the SOMA district settled in the Fillmore. Jewish-owned businesses opened on Fillmore and McAllister streets to serve the community. The district had three synagogues, a Yiddish Cultural Center and a school. The Fillmore was considered the center of the Jewish community in San Francisco in the early 20th century.

=== Japanese immigration and internment ===
A significant Japanese population has existed since the San Francisco Earthquake in 1906. The Japanese created a Japantown that still exists close to its original location today. In 1906, there were approximately 5,000 Japanese who lived within that section of town, making them the largest minority of the Fillmore district for a significant period of time.

Like many of the ethnic groups in San Francisco, the Japanese faced discrimination. The type of discrimination a Japanese person could expect to face was slightly different than the discrimination an African American would face. Many Americans perceived the Japanese as foreigners and as citizens of another country. It was a widely held belief that the Japanese in San Francisco and the Fillmore were still loyal to Japan even though many were 2nd or 3rd generation American citizens. The landmark Supreme Court case Ozawa v. United States ruling exemplified this type of racism when it confirmed the legal status of Japanese immigrants as "aliens ineligible to citizenship". This systemic racism towards the Japanese would eventually fuel the decision for the Issuing of executive order 9066 by president Franklin Roosevelt and the internment of all Japanese citizens. After the war, the Japanese slowly migrated back to the Fillmore district and the Japanese population would make its way back to pre-war levels within a few years.

Noted Japanese monk Nyogen Senzaki, who is credited with introducing Zen Buddhism in the United States opened the first zendo in an apartment on Bush Street in the Fillmore.

=== African-American community ===
Although some African Americans were present in the Fillmore District after the 1906 San Francisco earthquake, it would not be until WWII that the Fillmore District and San Francisco as a whole began to have a large African-American population. Between the years of 1940 and 1950, the African American population of San Francisco grew from 4,836 to 43,460, from 0.5% to 4.5% of the city's total population. A vast majority of these African Americans lived in the Fillmore District. The Japanese internment in 1942 had left a large number of unoccupied homes and businesses within the Fillmore, and the shipbuilding industry and wartime economy created by WWII brought a large number of wartime jobs into the city. Additionally, many African Americans had left the south in the Great Migration in order to escape Jim Crow laws.

This influx of African Americans during and after WWII created racial tension. Many African Americans were forced to live in certain neighborhoods of the city. The Civil Rights Movement succeeded in making significant legal gains for African Americans and many other ethnic groups. However, there are significant social tensions which still exist today. After the war, the African American population contributed significantly to the growing jazz culture in the Fillmore, with clubs, such as Jimbo's Bop City (ca 1950–1965), flourishing there. In addition, the trend of African American migration to the city and the district continued at a fast pace until it reached a peak of about 13 percent in the 1970s.

During the 1970s the Fillmore District was at the forefront of the redevelopment effort going on in the city. Many people ascribe the decline of the Fillmore district as a center for jazz and African Americans to this redevelopment. Since redevelopment started in the 1970s, the African American population in San Francisco went from around 13 percent to just under 6 percent of the overall population in 2010.

=== Redevelopment and displacement ===
After WWII, the city government began to grow increasingly wary of the supposed instability of the Fillmore District. In Lai Clement's article on the Fillmore district he stated that "At a 1948 public hearing, State Senator O'Gara noted that the Fillmore was the city's worst blighted area with metastasizing ramifications for the city's citizenry and other districts". Whether it really was or not is still up for debate. In general, the Fillmore District was seen as a district that was filled with poverty and in desperate need of remodeling. As a result, the city government of San Francisco established the San Francisco Redevelopment Agency (RDA) in order to spearhead the redevelopment effort.

The city focused its efforts into two main redevelopment projects known as A-1 and A-2. The A-1 redevelopment project began in 1956 and lasted until 1973. A-1 Primarily focused on the Japan town side of the Fillmore and had the JCTC (Japanese Cultural and Trade Center) as its so called "center piece". The project covered 28 city blocks, displaced around 8,000 people and destroyed 6,000 low renting housing units. The A-2 redevelopment project was started in 1966 and lasted until the end of the 1970s. This project spanned about 70 city blocks around the A-1 redevelopment area. It would end up displacing up to 13,500 residents, destroying 4,522 households and 5,000 low rent housing units.

The A-1 redevelopment project was considered to be a fantastic success by the RDA because it significantly boosted the economy in the area. However, both the A-1 and the A-2 projects were met with a large amount of popular resistance. Many of the people who criticized the redevelopment project were the many who were forcibly removed from the area. In particular, the A-2 redevelopment project was often described as being a disaster for the overall culture present in the Fillmore and was definitely the more unpopular of the two projects. Specifically, the A-2 project was considered to be detrimental to the jazz scene in the area according to many anti redevelopment organizations such as WACO. Forced to confront the growing amount of popular unrest, the RDA justified its redevelopment projects by saying that any former residents would be able to come back to their homes after the redevelopment was finished. The RDA also argued that the redevelopment projects would spur a new economic boom in the area. However, both of these statements turned out to be false. The increased housing prices of the redeveloped area would force many of the former residents to move away because they couldn't afford the newly built housing. Also, the envisioned economic boom of the A-2 project never came. Investors and developers were not willing to establish the commercial stores in the rebuilt area for a few different reasons. First, developers would not come to the area because it was likely to cause traffic problems for potential shoppers. Second, there was considerable backlash from proposition 14 that might threaten potential investors development. Finally, developers did not want to invest in commercial stores in the area because there was still a racialized stigma that the Fillmore District was a "bad" neighborhood.

As a result of the project's displacement of residents and businesses, its mixed and arguably discriminatory economic impact, and its design (featuring mid-century renewal concepts such as superblocks and strict separation of uses), the redevelopment of the Fillmore is considered by most to have been unsuccessful and regrettable. Post-redevelopment, encroaching gentrification and the physical decay of cheaply constructed housing complexes have led to a neighborhood of stark contrasts between rich and poor. As of 2001, only 4% of the "Certificates of Preference" issued to businesses forced out by the RDA had been redeemed.

=== Urban renewal ===
In the 1990s–2000s, the neighborhood underwent another wave of urban renewal and gentrification in the form of a new "Jazz District" along Fillmore Street with mostly upscale jazz-themed restaurants, and proposed condominium construction.

=== Financial role ===
After the collapse of Market Street during the 1906 earthquake, many of the commercial businesses and financial institutions moved to the Fillmore District. Since then, the Fillmore has played a vital role in the economy of San Francisco. However, after most of Market Street was rebuilt, many businesses moved back and the Financial District once again eclipsed the Fillmore district in terms of economic importance.

=== Loss of supermarket ===
In January 2024, Safeway announced that it was closing the Fillmore District location; the store had been open since 1984. They reversed course — temporarily — due to public pressure, but on December 11, 2024 announced that the store would be closing on or around February 7, 2025.Safeway had already agreed to sell the underlying land to Align Real Estate, which had indicated that it planned to build a mixed-use development on the site.

== Landmarks and features ==
Fillmore Street, the neighborhood's main commercial strip, reflects Fillmore's diversity: family-owned neighborhood-serving retail mixes with chain stores, jazz clubs, and ethnic restaurants of many varieties. Some of the stores, restaurants, and clubs lost to redevelopment are memorialized by plaques on the sidewalk.

There is a branch of the San Francisco public library located at Geary and Scott.

=== Fillmore Auditorium ===
The historic Fillmore Auditorium is located in the neighborhood at the corner of Geary Boulevard and Fillmore Street. A major national concert venue famous as the focus point of the psychedelic music scene during the 1960s, it was home to early concerts by Jefferson Airplane and the Grateful Dead among others.

=== Jazz and blues ===
In the 1940s and 1950s, it was known as the "Harlem of the West" and attracted many leading jazz performers including Louis Armstrong, John Coltrane, Ella Fitzgerald, Billie Holiday and the "Bird" (Charlie Parker). Fillmore Street and nearby areas was filled with nightclubs. Jimbo's Bop City, at 1690 Post Street in what is now Japantown, was a nightclub frequented by noted jazz musicians of the 1940s and 1950s and is reported to be the only venue to host Parker and Armstrong together at the same time. One of the oldest jazz performers in the Bay Area currently living, Frank R. Fisher, performed in Fillmore District in the 40s and 50s.

During the redevelopment of the neighborhood, the building that once housed Bop City was moved from its location on Post Street two blocks to the west to 1712 Fillmore Street, where it now houses an Afrocentric bookstore, Marcus Bookstore.

As part of efforts in the 1990s to revitalize the Fillmore district, the San Francisco Redevelopment Agency created the Historic Fillmore Jazz Preservation District to encourage the development of entertainment and commercial businesses in this historical area. A Jazz Heritage Center was created within a major new apartment and commercial development, the Fillmore Heritage Center, which housed the San Francisco branch of Yoshi's jazz club. In 2012, Yoshi's SF filed for Chapter 11 bankruptcy, and in 2014 it closed and was replaced by The Addition which closed its doors on January 14, 2015.

Many nightclubs (Leola Kings Bird Cage, Wesley Johnson's Texas PlayHouse, Shelton's Blue Mirror, and Jacks of Sutter) existed on the Fillmore, bringing major musical icons to the neighborhood including Ella Fitzgerald, Louis Armstrong, and Billie Holiday.

=== Markets and festivals ===
A Farmers' Market is held at the Fillmore Center Plaza on Saturday mornings, year round. The market features local jazz musicians as well as California-grown produce.

The Fillmore Street Jazz Festival is held annually in July. The Fillmore Fridays Outdoor Music and Cinema Series is held Friday evenings between August and October.

The Juneteenth Festival (Emancipation of Enslaved African Americans) is held every June 19.

=== Public transit ===
The neighborhood, thanks to its central location, is served by several Muni bus lines including the 22, 21, 24, 38, 31, 43, 47, 49, and 5.

=== The Peoples Temple ===
In 1971, the Peoples Temple, a new religious organization, established its headquarters at 1859 Geary Boulevard, situated on the edge of the Fillmore district. Led by Jim Jones, the church began spreading its message of apostolic socialism and racial integration to the Fillmore district. This resonated well with the residents, who viewed Jones as a promising figure amidst the challenging conditions that followed urban renewal in the area. In Neighborhoods: The Hidden Cities of San Francisco, The Fillmore Charles Collins, a former Fillmore resident, says "[Jones] came into a community that needed to have a sense of belonging. For people who needed to come together. People who were broken." Reverend Hannibal Williams, a former community organizer in the Fillmore, says, "people were desperate for solutions. People needed something to follow. Jim Jones was a solution. He was something to follow."

Jones effectively appealed to the predominantly Black congregation in the Fillmore district by employing the language and oral traditions of Black churches. This approach struck a chord with many of his followers who had previously attended Black churches. Additionally, he utilized charisma, manipulative tactics, and mind control techniques to gain the loyalty and obedience of numerous residents in the Fillmore.

In 1974, Jim Jones made the decision to relocate the Peoples Temple to Guyana, believing it to be the ideal setting to establish the socialist racially integrated mission he envisioned. He also hoped to escape mounting pressures from negative publicity and ongoing investigations by the media in San Francisco. Through his persuasive tactics, Jones managed to convince many Fillmore residents to join him. After a year of constructing the commune, Jones led his followers in a tragic event that would forever be known as the Jonestown massacre. 918 individuals lost their lives, with a significant portion hailing from the Fillmore district. The former San Francisco headquarters of the Peoples Temple is now occupied by a United States Post Office building.

== See also ==
- Bethel African Methodist Episcopal Church (San Francisco, California)
- The Chutes of San Francisco
