= Japan Center (San Francisco) =

- Exterior of Japan Center East, Hotel Kabuki visible in background
- Location: San Francisco, California, United States
- Coordinates: 37.785°N 122.430°W
- Opened: 1968
- Developer: National-Braemar; Kinki Nippon Railway
- Public transit: SF Muni #2 Clement, #3 Jackson, 22 Fillmore, 38 Geary/38R Geary Rapid
- Website: japancentersf.com

The Japan Center is a shopping center in the Japantown neighborhood of San Francisco, California. It opened in March 1968 and was originally called the Japanese Cultural and Trade Center. It is bounded by Geary (on the south), Post (on the north), Fillmore (on the west), and Laguna (on the east). The mall itself is composed of three mall buildings; from west to east, they are the Kinokuniya Mall, Kintetsu Mall (now Japan Center West), and Miyako Mall (now Japan Center East). Anchor tenants include Books Kinokuniya and Sundance Kabuki Cinema.

Selected locations in Japan Center
- Shopping
- Theatre
- Parks and open spaces
- Lodging
1 AMC Kabuki 8
2 Books Kinokuniya
3 Japan Center West (was Kintetsu Mall)
4 San Francisco Peace Pagoda
5 Japan Center East (was Miyako Mall)
6 Hotel Kabuki

== History ==
The San Francisco Board of Supervisors designated what became Area A-1 of the Western Addition Project (WAP A-1), a 108-acre (44 ha) parcel, as a redevelopment project in August 1948. In total, 8,000 residents were displaced from this area, which was acquired by the San Francisco Redevelopment Agency (SFRA) starting in the late 1950s under eminent domain. Western Addition Project Area A-1 included the land later used for the mall. art of the 108 acres (44 ha) of land The Japanese Cultural and Trade Center was the first major project headed by M. Justin Herman, director of SFRA. The mall was developed by National-Braemar, who were joined by Kintetsu Enterprises Company of America (wholly owned by the Kinki Nippon Railway) in 1962. Construction of the mall began in 1965. In 1966, Herman told The New York Times "We set out four or five years ago to try and crystallize and preserve the special cultural and social values of San Francisco, which in time tend to be lost and dissipated." Mayor Joseph Alioto dedicated the mall at its opening.

The initial tenants included the manufacturers Hitachi, Nissan, and Mitsubishi, who used their showroom spaces to demonstrate electronics and automobiles; Kikkoman International; the 15-story Miyako Hotel; and Books Kinokuniya. The mall was renamed Japan Center by 1970, and by the mid-70s, retailers had displaced manufacturers as consumers had become familiar with Japanese electronics and cars.

In 2009, ownership of the buildings and spaces was divided between:

- Kabuki Sundance Theater (1881 Post), owned by Japan Center Kabuki I LLC, c/o 3D Investments
- Kinokuniya Building (1825 Post), owned by Kinokuniya Book Stores of America
- Kintetsu Mall (11 Peace Plaza), owned by Kintetsu Enterprises Company of America
- Peace Plaza, owned by San Francisco, Recreation and Parks Department
- Miyako Mall (22 Peace Plaza), owned by Union Bank of California
- Hotel Kabuki (1625 Post), owned by Japan Center Hotel Associates, c/o 3D Investments

By 2020, 3D Investments had bought the former Kintetsu Mall and Miyako Mall, now called Japan Center West and Japan Center East respectively.

Due to the COVID-19 pandemic in the United States across San Francisco Bay Area in Northern California, businesses in Japan Center have been described as struggling. According to a lawyer for the tenants, some had lost as much as $17,000 per month, and 3D Investments had not been forgiving to its tenants, while at Kinokuniya Inc., "no one is responding."

In 2023, a renovation plan for the plaza was approved, and in 2024, construction had begun.

== Shops and restaurants ==
The Fuki-ya restaurant owned by Junko and Richard K. Diran is said to have been the first Robatayaki restaurant in the United States.

== Hotel ==
The hotel, anchoring the east end of the super-block, was originally constructed by the Kinki Nippon Railway and operated by the Western Hotels Company as the Miyako Hotel. The Miyako originally occupied the 15-story tower, and the 4-story building to the east of the tower, which originally housed the Consulate General of Japan, was later incorporated into the hotel property.

== Design and features ==
The Japan Center complex occupies 5 acres (2.0 ha) of land and the construction budget was $15 million.

The architecture of the site, created by Minoru Yamasaki, has been described as "Brutalist slabwork." Van Bourg/Nakamura drafted the plans for Japan Center. It uses contemporary forms and materials and is inspired by traditional Japanese architectural features. The interiors of the mall buildings were designed by Takenaka & Associates of Osaka to evoke narrow Japanese streets, as shop facades include decorative glazed tile roofs and pillars; the interiors also include large public areas with natural lighting. Structural steel for the Bridge of Shops was supplied by U.S. Steel, American Bridge Division in South San Francisco, California.

San Francisco's Peace Pagoda is on the Japan Center site. The Peace Plaza was originally designed by Japanese architect Yoshirō Taniguchi, and an update in 2000 by Kenji Murokami removed a large covered walkway on the north side (connecting Japan Center West and East). The Peace Plaza was rededicated by Mayor Willie Brown in 2003.

== Gallery ==
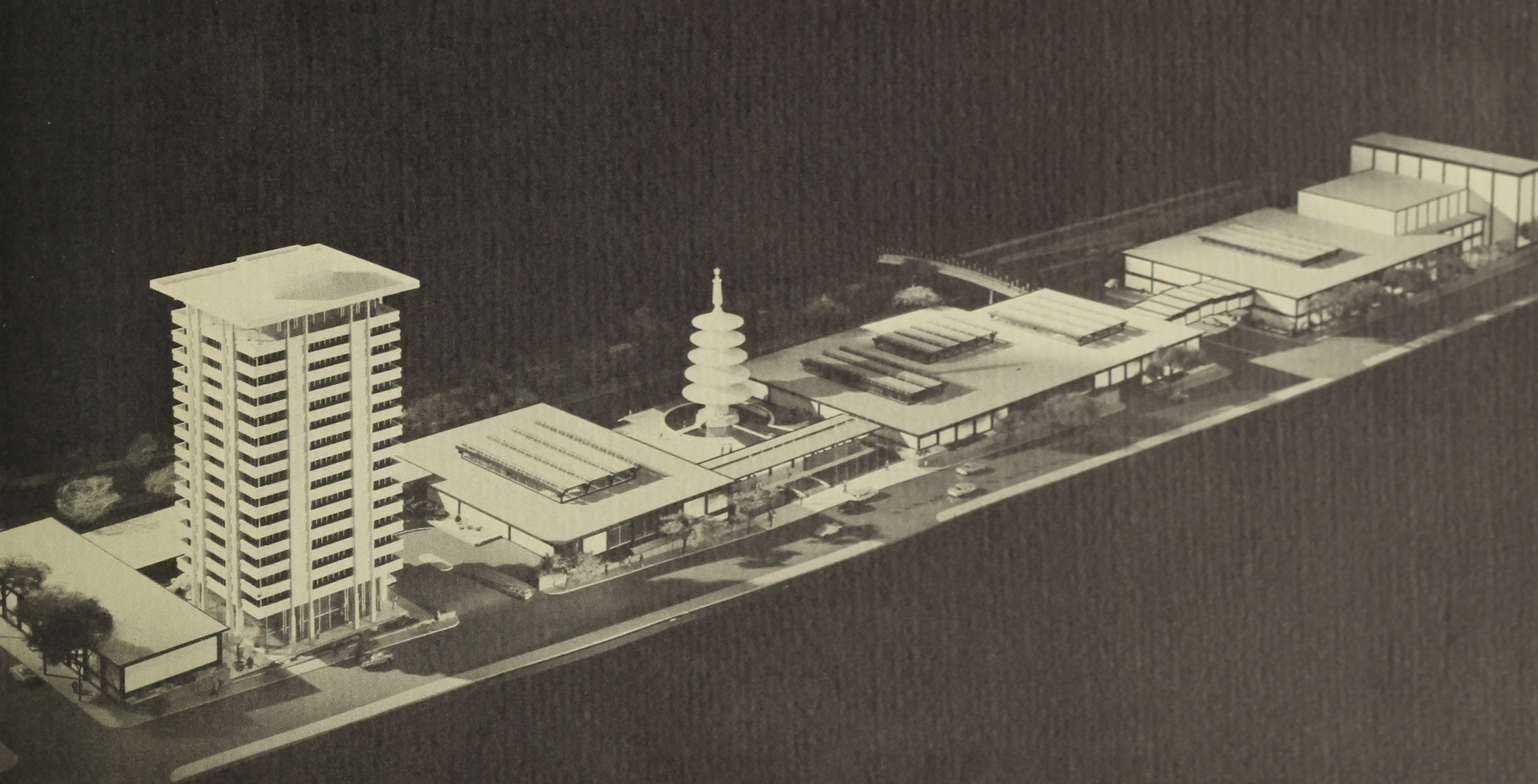
Architectural model (c.1965), looking south from Post

Schematic layout and original names (Feb 1968)

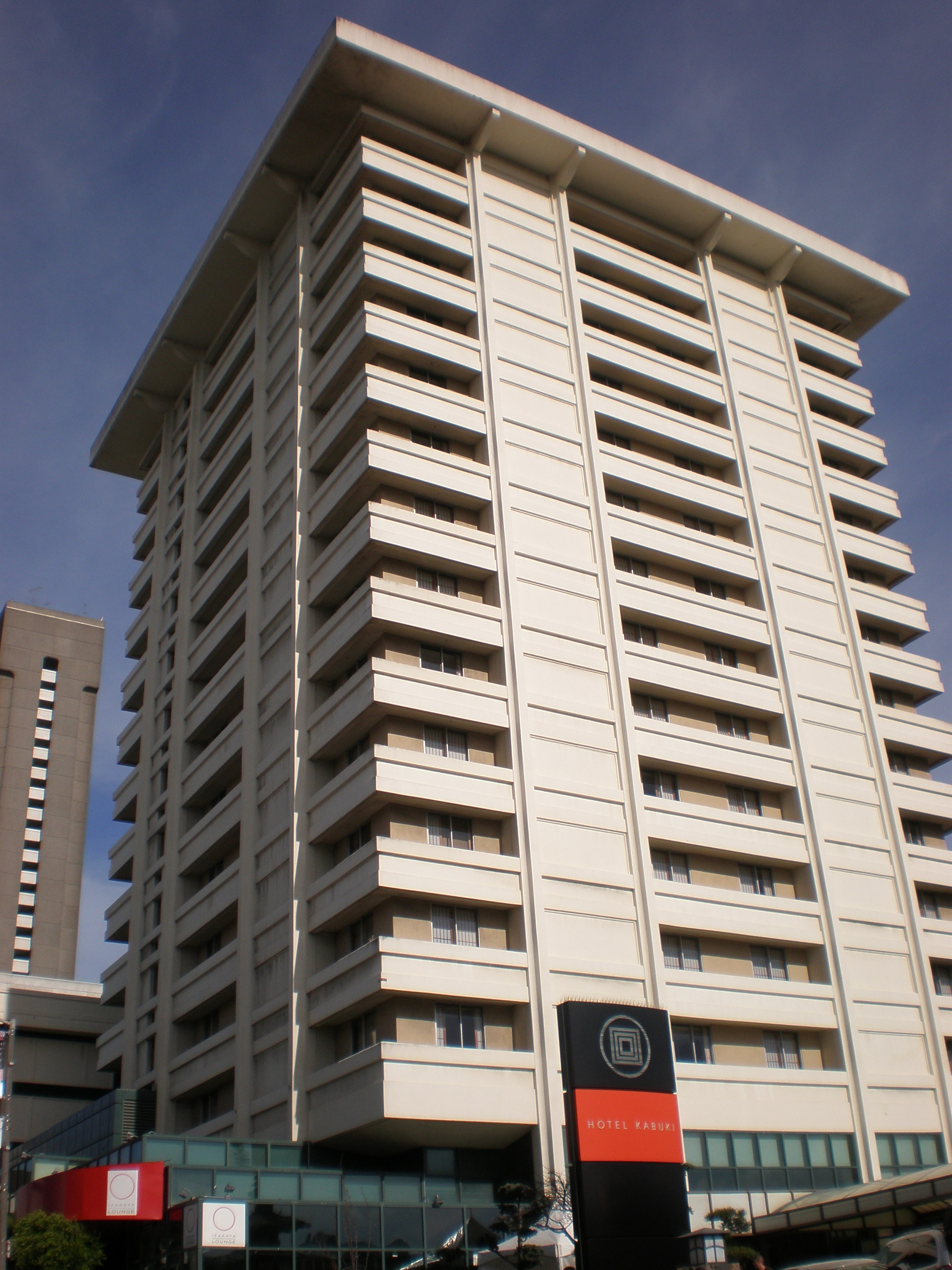
Hotel Kabuki (2009)

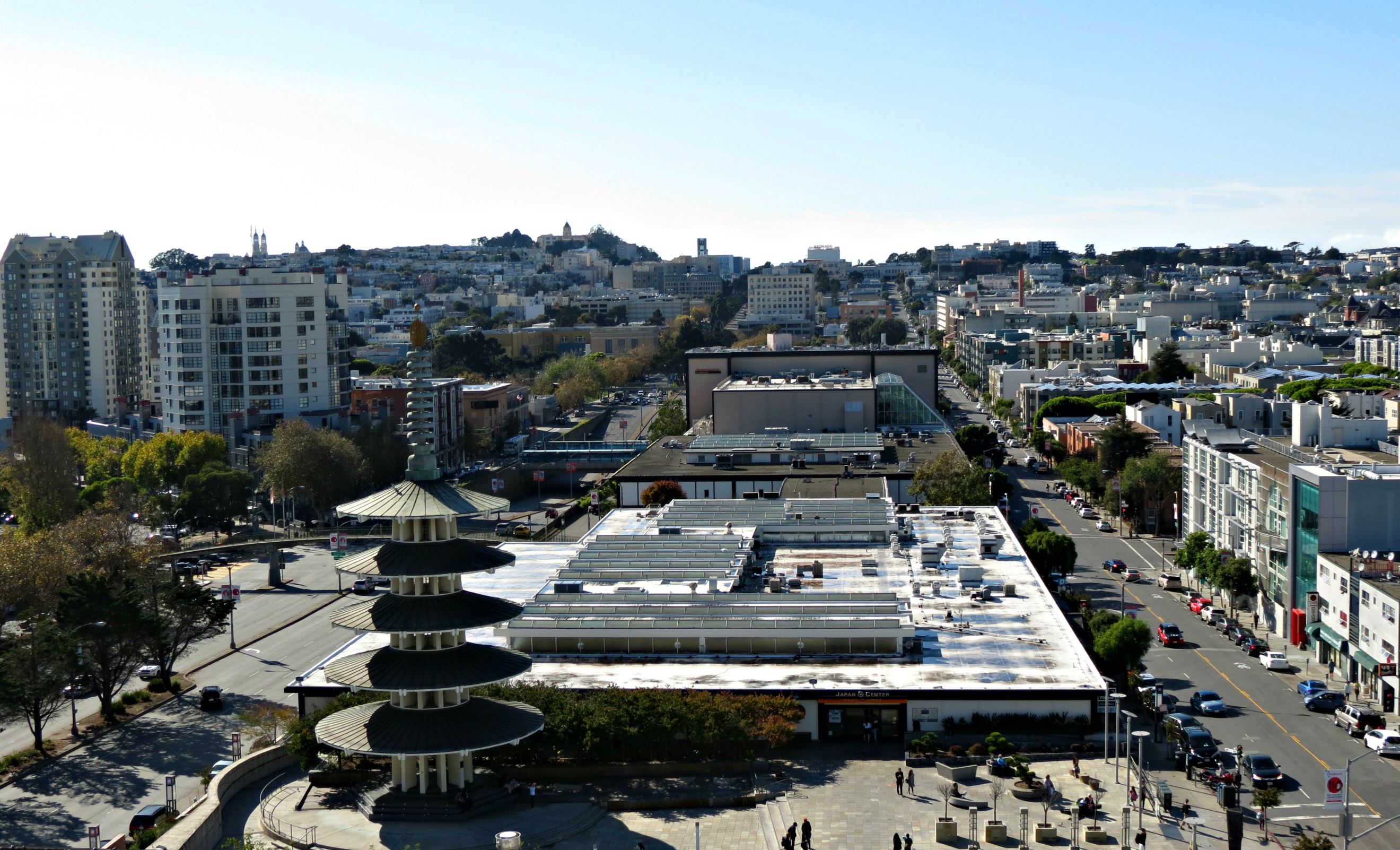
West from Hotel Kabuki (2016)

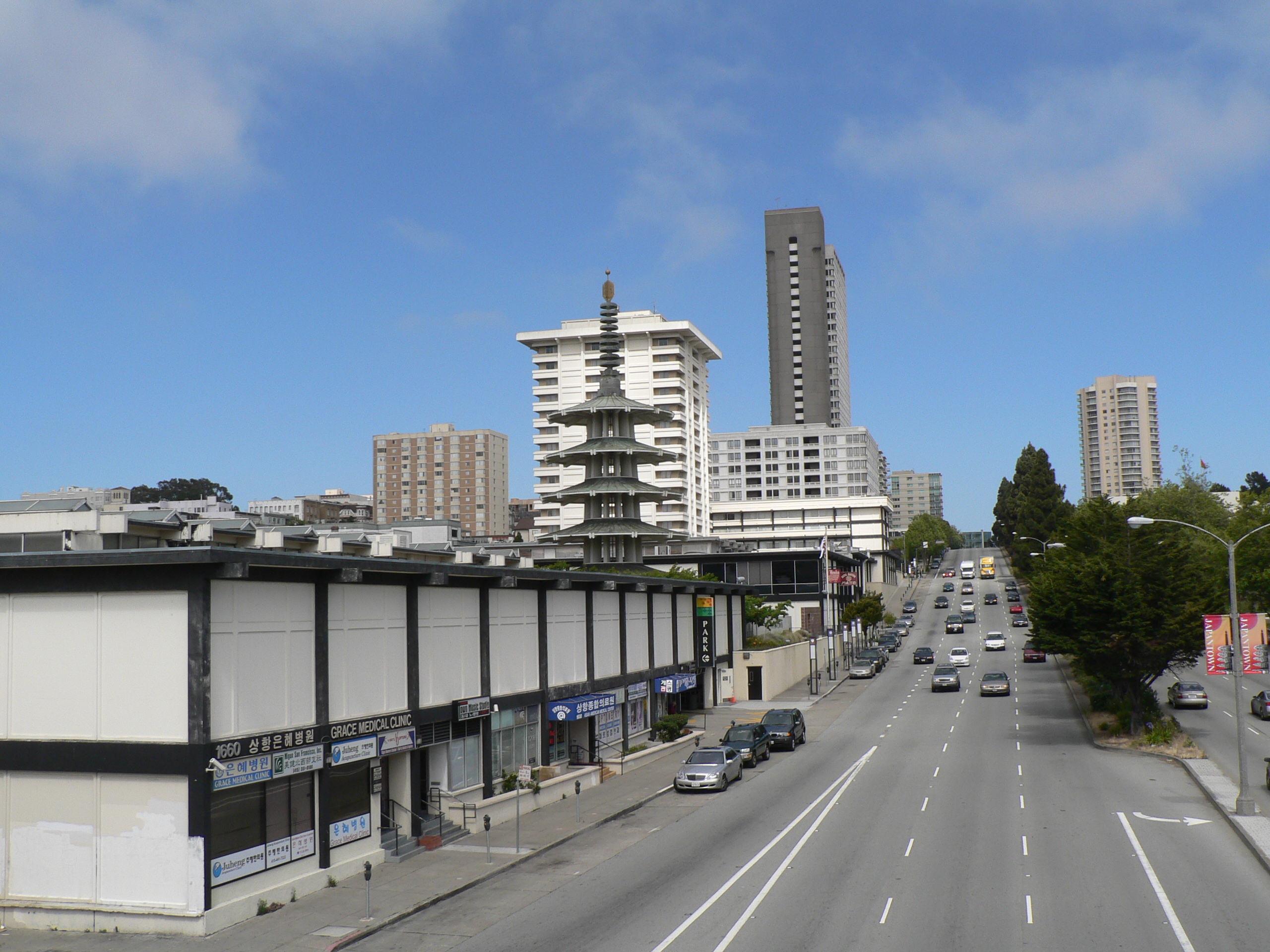
East along Geary (2009)

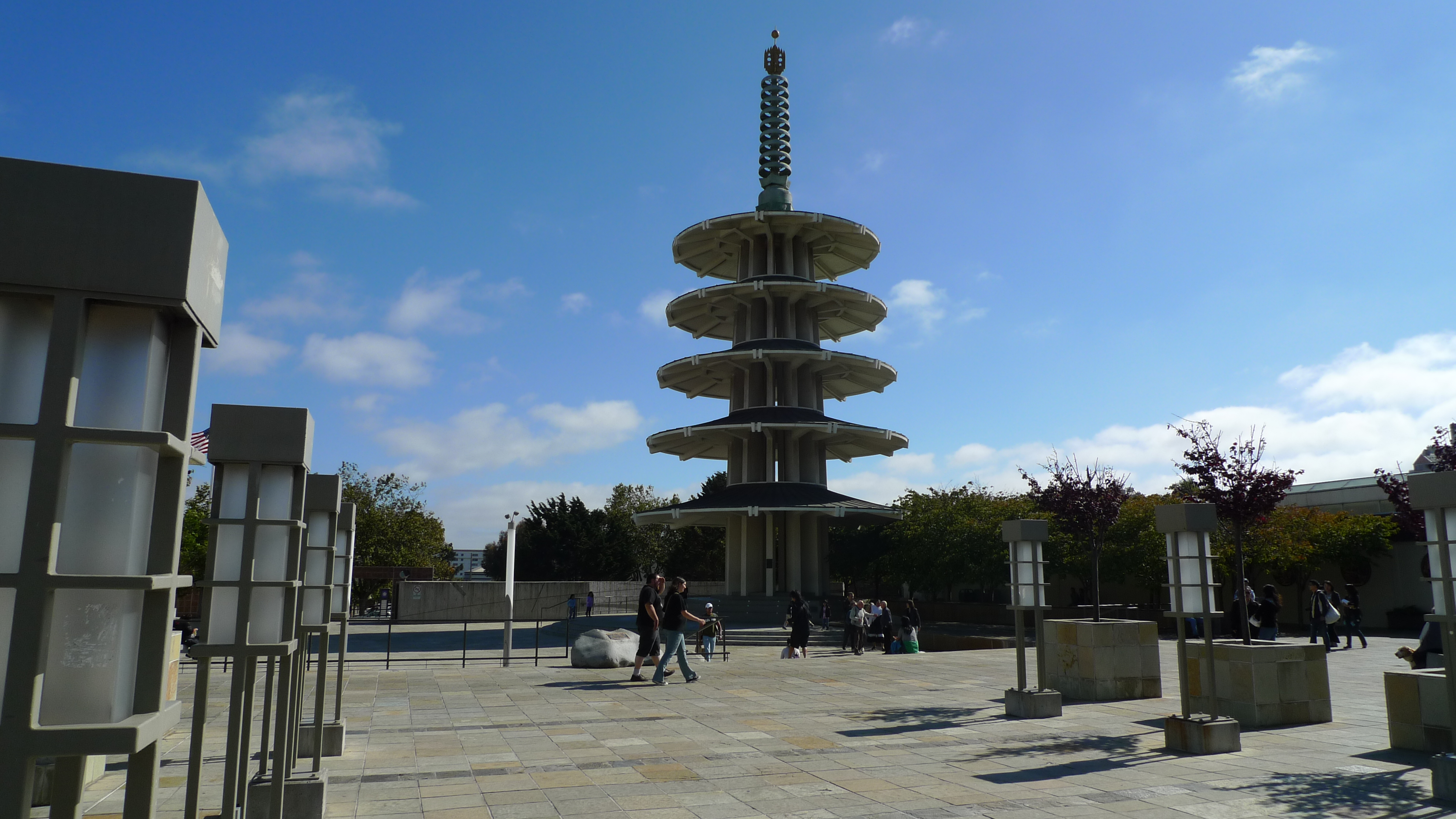
Peace Plaza and Pagoda (2010)

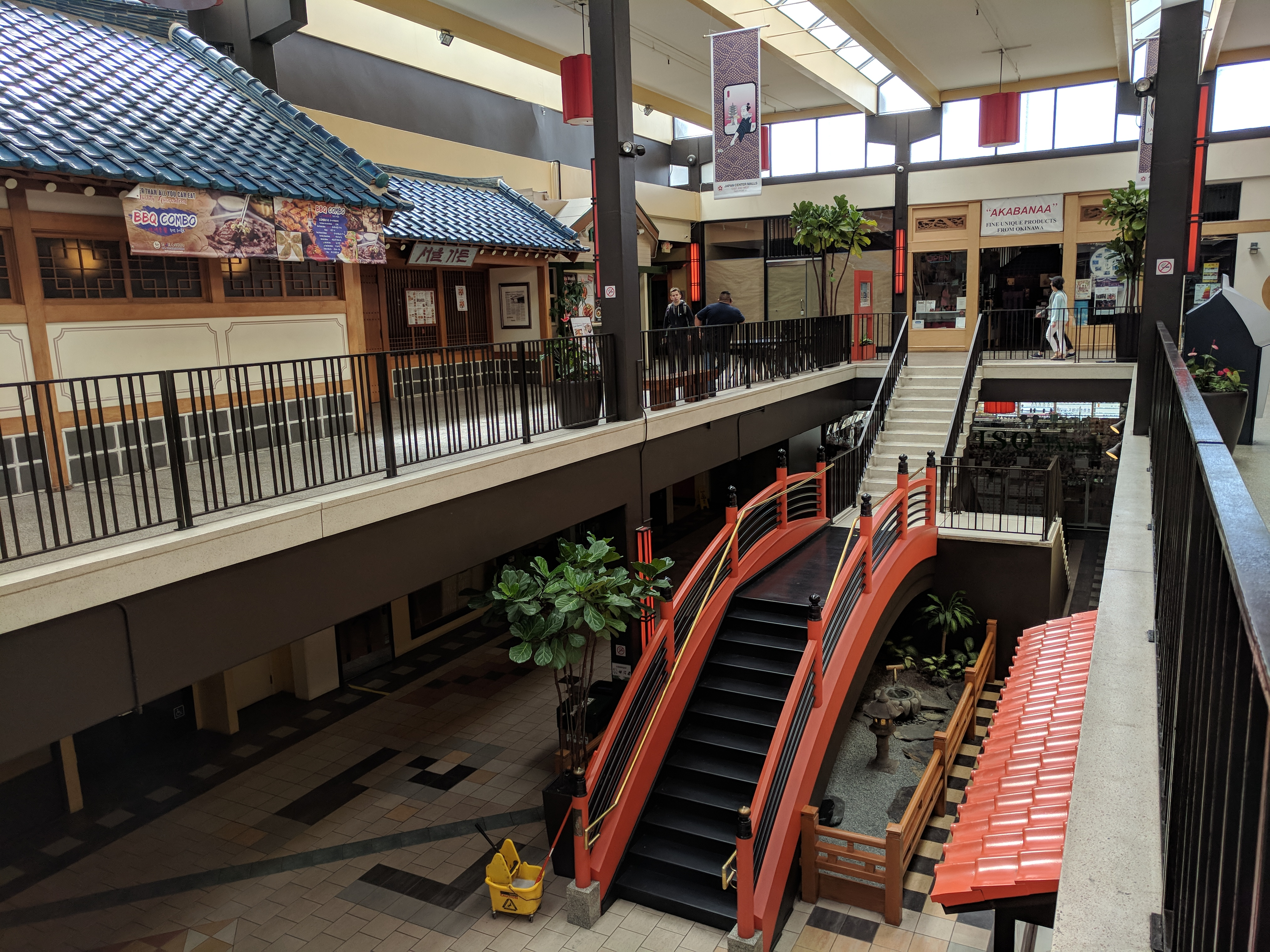
Moon bridge and shops in Miyako Mall (2018)

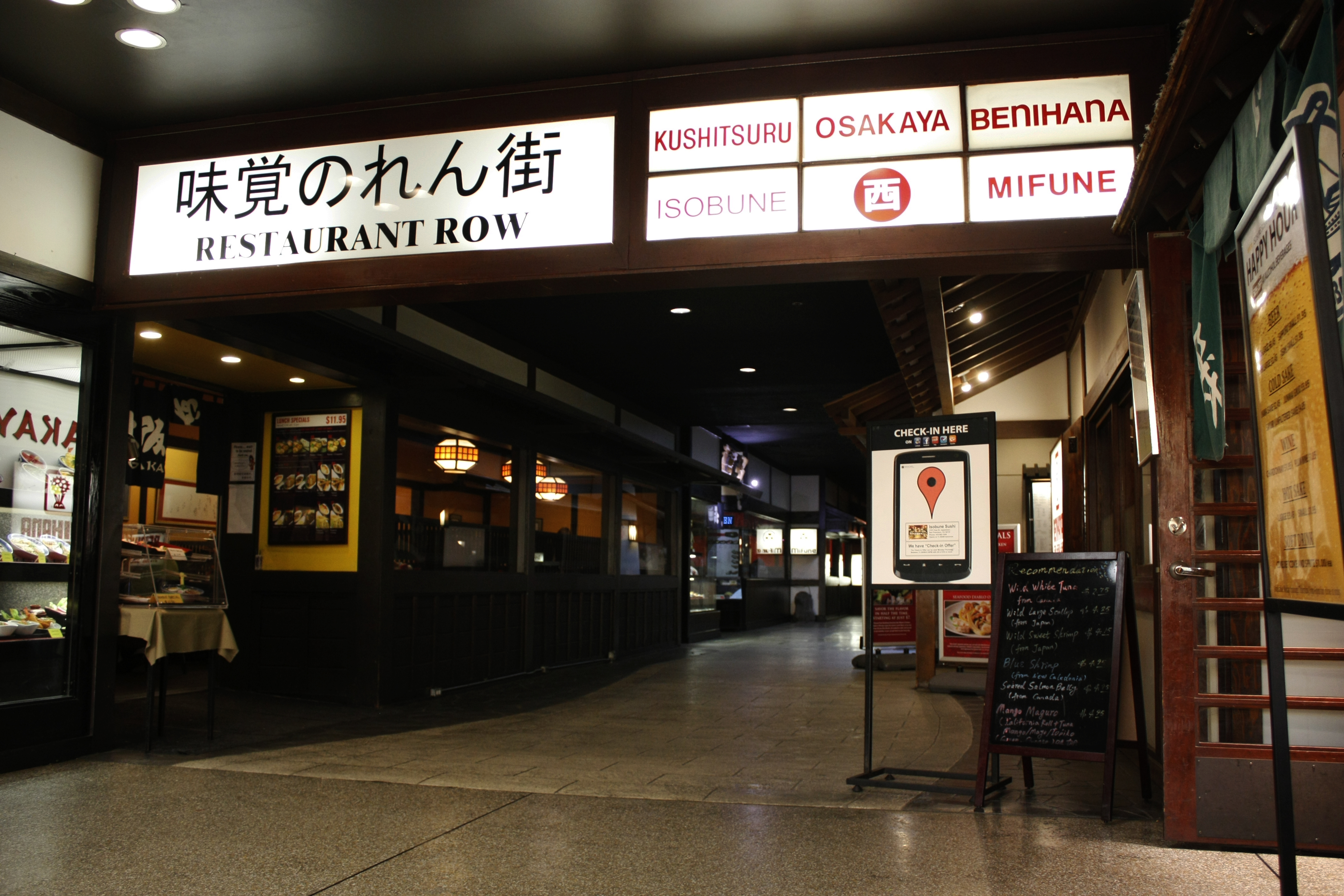
"Restaurant Row" in Japan Center West (2013)

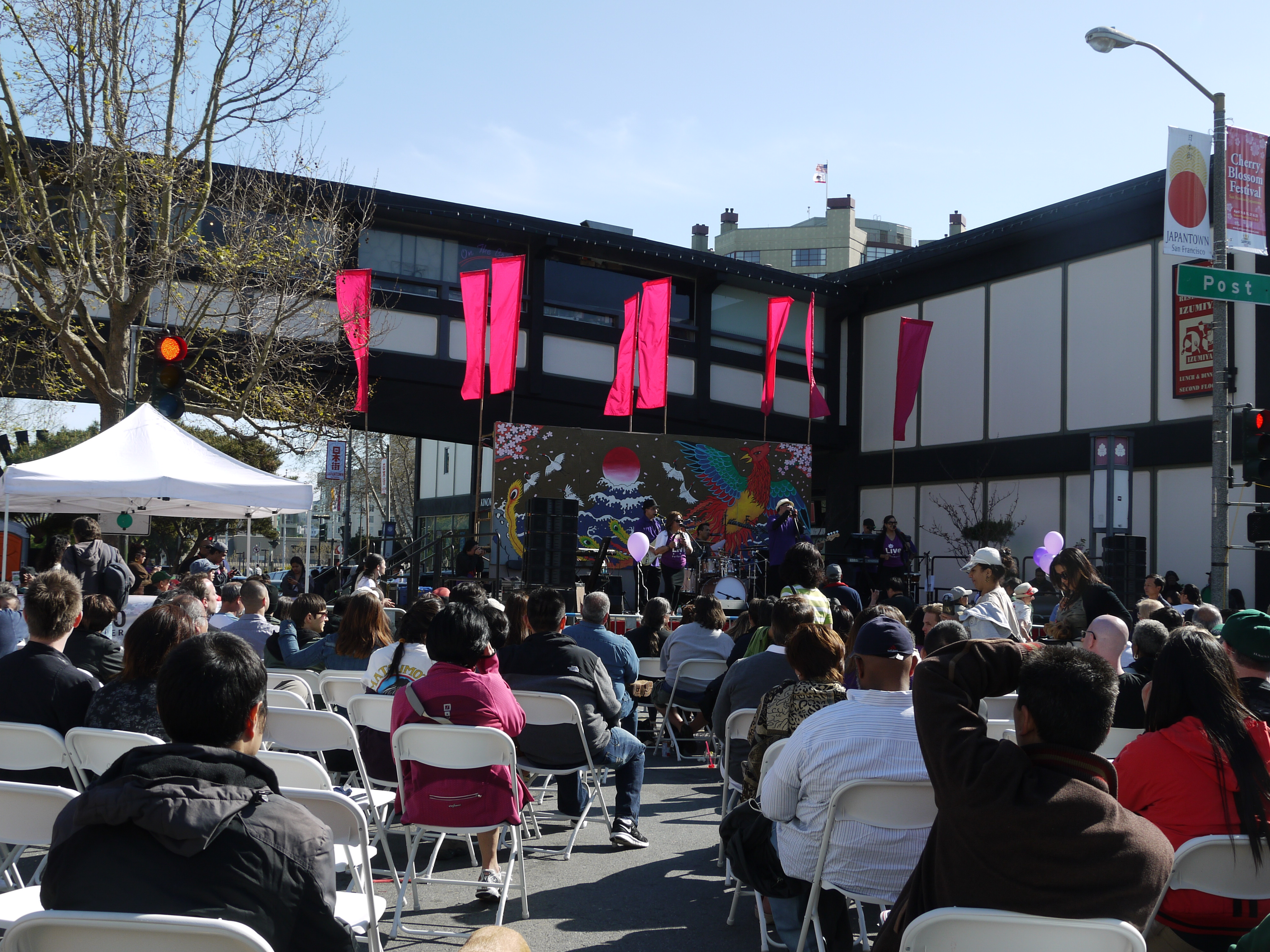
Bridge over Webster Street (2012)

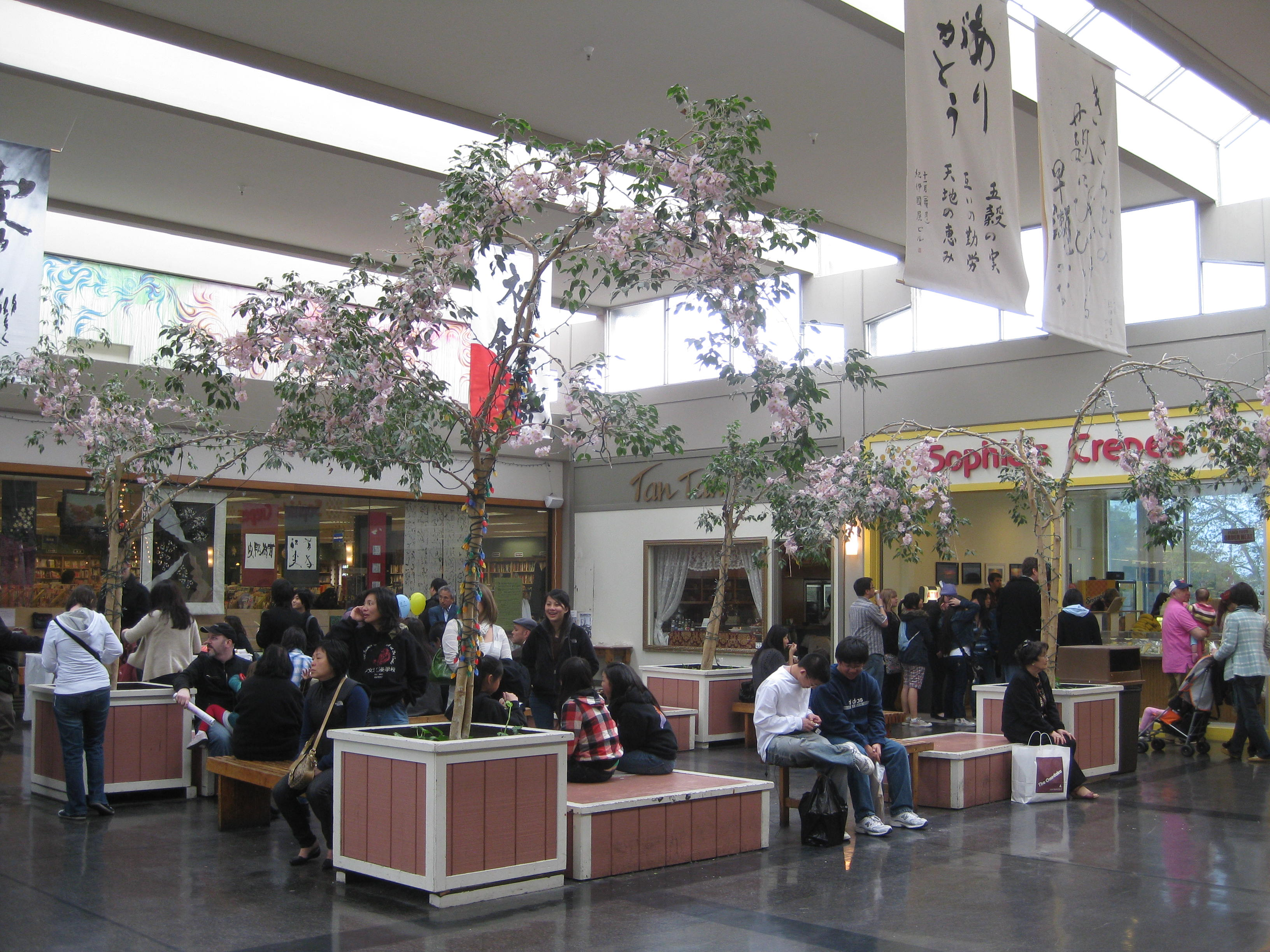
Open space in Kinokuniya Mall (2010)
