= AMC Kabuki 8 =

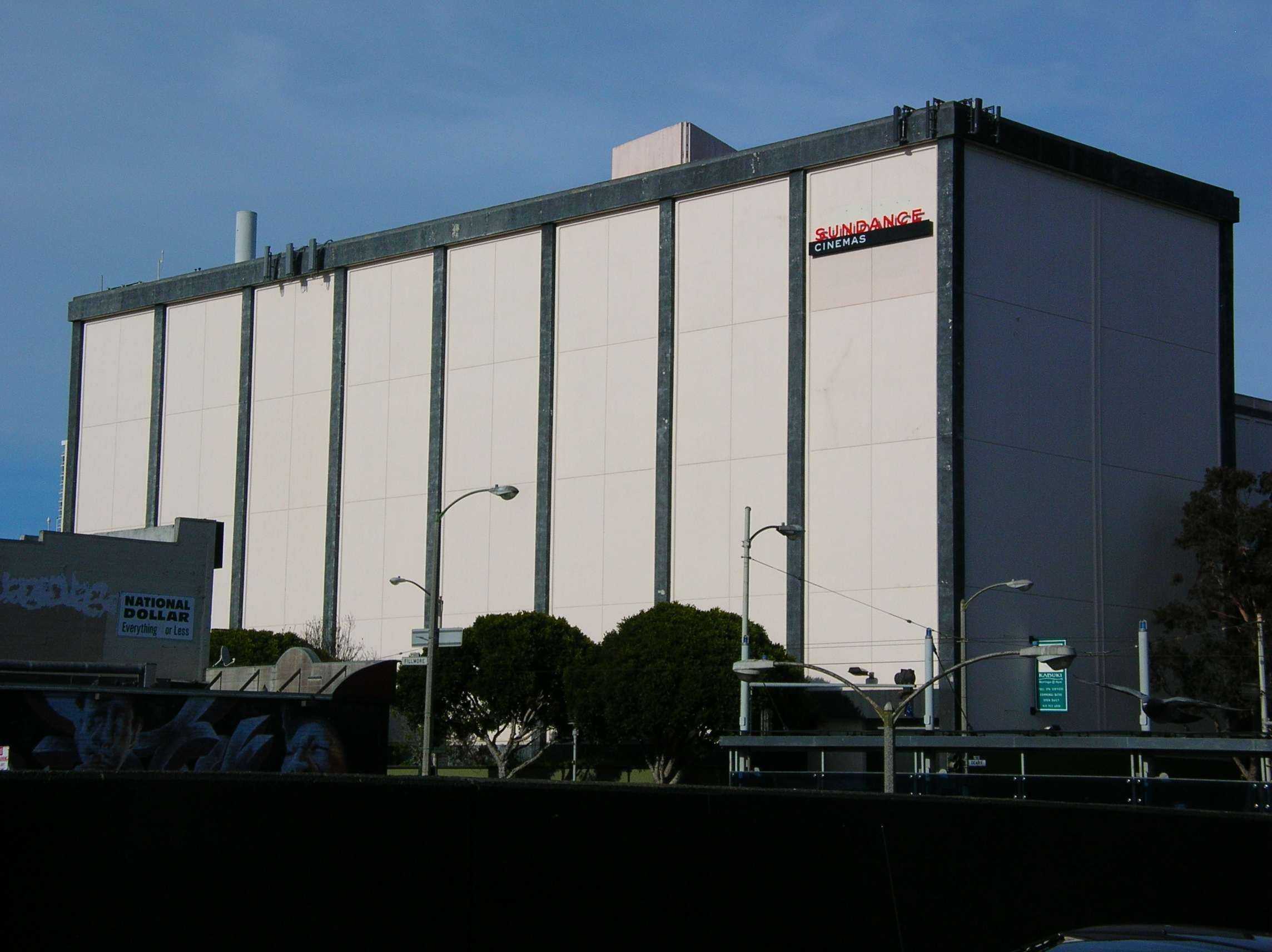
- Exterior of AMC Kabuki 8 circa 2009
- Former names: AMC Kabuki Cinema 8, Sundance Kabuki, AMC Dine-in Kabuki 8

General information
- Status: Completed
- Location: Japan Center, 1881 Post Street, San Francisco, California, USA
- Coordinates: 37.785°N 122.433°W
- Opened: 1960
- Renovated: 2006–2007

AMC Kabuki 8 is a movie theater in the Japan Center complex in San Francisco's Japantown neighborhood.

== History ==
Kabuki Theater originally opened in 1960 as a large dinner theater.

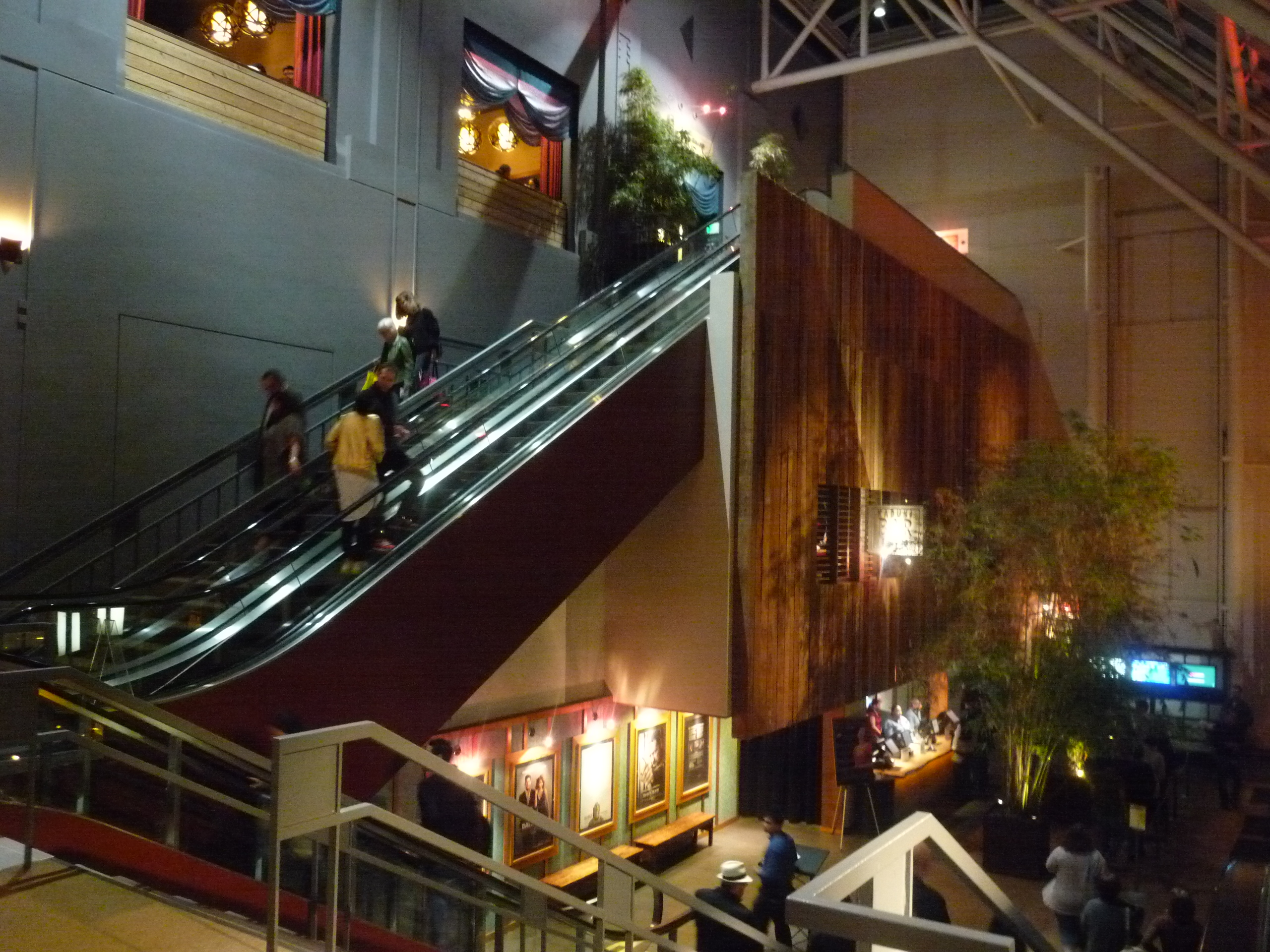
Interiors of Sundance Kabuki in 2010

The theater was the first multiplex in San Francisco. As part of the original Japan Center mission to showcase Japanese culture, it was the first authentic Kabuki theater in America, designed in a traditional 17th-century style with a proscenium, stage entrance/exit ramp, revolving stage, and trap doors. The theater was designed with dining tables so audiences could eat while watching Kabuki performances. The restaurant, named the Kabuki Theater Restaurant, was limited to serving Chinese and American food so it wouldn't draw business away from the Japan Center Japanese restaurants.

It has hosted San Francisco's Cherry Blossom Festival activities, is one of a small number of theaters showing performances by the San Francisco Opera, and has screened several films for San Francisco International Film Festival and San Francisco International Asian American Film Festival as recently as 2011.

== Ownership ==
Formerly the AMC Kabuki Cinema 8, it was acquired by Robert Redford's Sundance Cinemas chain in 2006 as part of an anti-trust agreement allowing AMC to acquire Loews. Sundance renovated the theater, and reopened it under its current name in December 2007, as the chain's second theater. On October 6, 2015, it was announced that Carmike Cinemas has acquired Sundance Cinemas for $36 million. On November 15, 2016, Carmike was purchased by AMC Theatres for $1.2 billion, bringing the theater back into AMC's control.

AMC announced on March 1, 2017, that the Carmike owned brands would be retired and all theaters would be placed under one of three new AMC brands. The Sundance Kabuki was renamed the AMC Dine-in Kabuki 8 in April 2017. In April 2018, the theater was re-branded the AMC Kabuki 8, dropping the "Dine-in".
