= San Francisco Peace Pagoda =

Stupa in San Francisco, California, USA

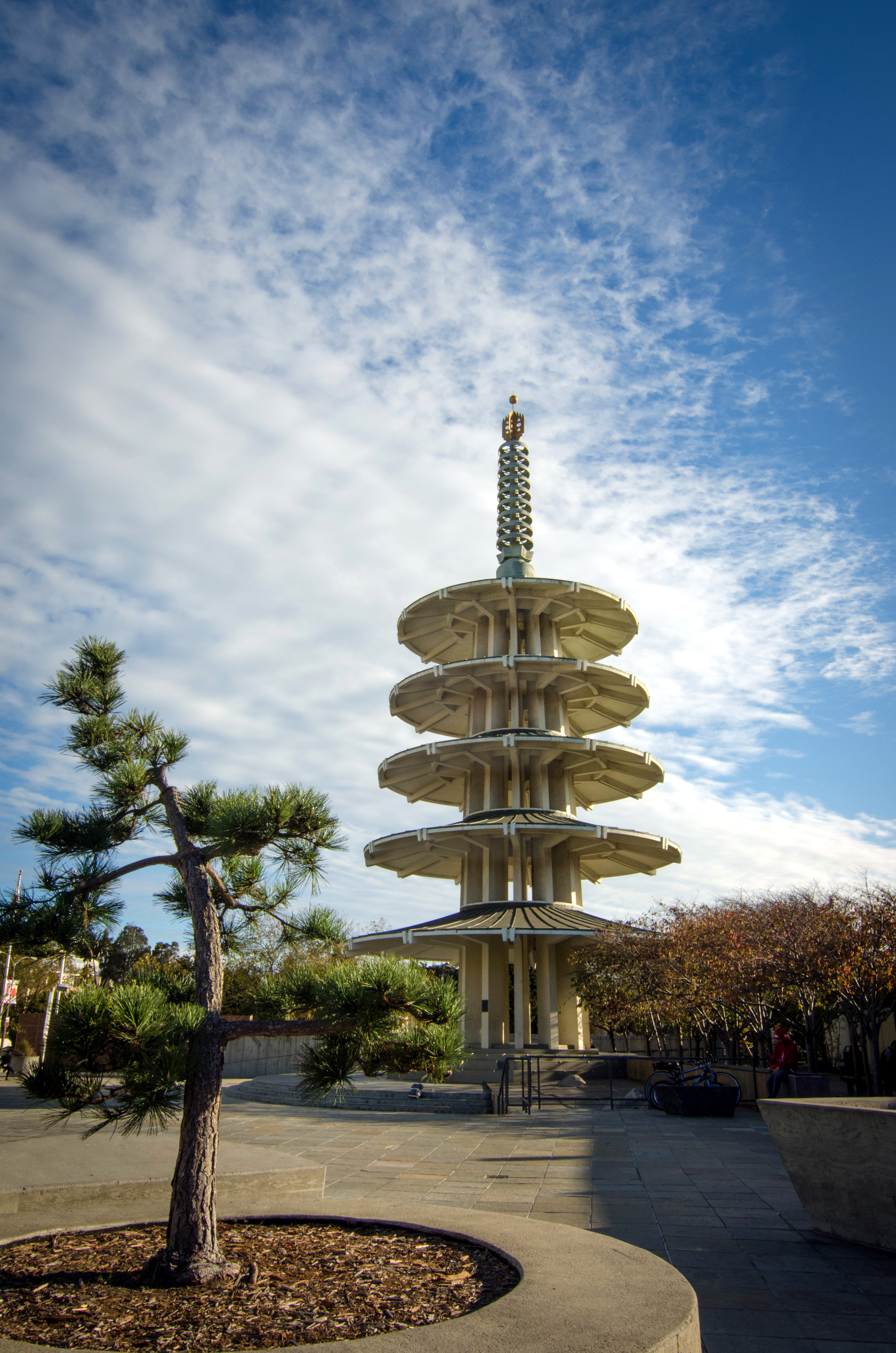
- Peace Pagoda (2012), San Francisco, California

- Location within San Francisco Location within San Francisco Bay Area

Religion
- Affiliation: Buddhism

Location
- Location: Nihonmachi (Japantown)
- Country: United States
- Interactive map of San Francisco Peace Pagoda
- Coordinates: 37.785054°N 122.429827°W

Architecture
- Completed: September 15, 1968

The San Francisco Peace Pagoda is a five-tiered concrete stupa between Post and Geary Streets at Buchanan in San Francisco's Nihonmachi (Japantown). The Pagoda, located in the southwestern corner of Peace Plaza between the Japan Center Mall and Nihonmachi Mall, was constructed in the 1960s and presented to San Francisco by its sister city Osaka, Japan on March 28, 1968. It was designed by Japanese architect Yoshiro Taniguchi.

== History ==
The San Francisco Peace Pagoda and Peace Plaza are in the center of the Japan Center Mall, which was completed in 1968 as one of the first projects undertaken by M. Justin Herman and the San Francisco Redevelopment Agency (SFRA) in the Western Addition. Western Addition Redevelopment Project Area A-1 demolished the historic core of Japantown and replaced it with the Japan Center. Unlike the rest of Japan Center, which was funded by corporate interests, the Peace Pagoda was built mainly using contributions from San Francisco's sister city, Osaka.

Masayuki Tokioka, president of National-Braemar (the company that had been selected by SFRA to develop the Japan Center site), is credited with the idea to include a pagoda on the site; according to a 1961 article in the San Francisco Chronicle covering Mayor George Christopher's request to the Japanese government for the gift of a "Pagoda for Peace", Tokioka "envisoned it as a symbol of Japanese-American friendship in the way that the gift of the Statue of Liberty enhanced Franco-American amity". Tokioka said he conceived of the pagoda to demonstrate "the majority—a big majority—of the Japanese people are friends of the Americans" after the June 1960 riots that forced President Dwight Eisenhower to cancel a planned trip to Japan.

In the mid-1980s, National-Braemar's parent company, Manoa Finance, went bankrupt and National-Braemar was forced to sell its assets, including the Japan Center development and a portion of the Peace Plaza. The new owner, Sinclair Louie, had discussed building a commercial space on the Plaza, although no plans were ever presented to SFRA for approval. The San Francisco Board of Supervisors responded by passing a resolution to designate Peace Plaza as a permanent open space, and then the City Recreation and Park Commission took complete ownership of the Plaza in 1989 through eminent domain. Continuing issues with leaks draining the reflecting pools into the garage underneath led to the permanent drainage and removal of landscaping in 1990.

=== Construction ===
Construction of the Pagoda was underway when Japan Center was dedicated on March 28, 1968. The dedication was attended by the Ambassador from Japan, Takesō Shimoda, and the deputy mayor of Osaka, Yasushi Oshima; during the dedication ceremonies, the eternal flame was lit from a torch brought from the Sumiyoshi taisha in Osaka. The Martinelli Construction Company of San Francisco oversaw construction of the Pagoda, and it was dedicated in a separate ceremony on September 15, 1968.

== Design ==
The Peace Pagoda lifts up its hundred-feet-high spire to the skies of California. It presents a magnificent view to all esthetically minded people who raise their eyes up to the horizon on the perimeters of San Francisco.

— Yoshirō Taniguchi, The Peace Pagoda - Its Beauty and Its Spirit (May 10, 1963)

The design for the Peace Pagoda was completed by April 1963, when the San Francisco Chronicle printed an article showing a rendering of the completed Peace Pagoda and Plaza; Justin Herman said he had approved the modern concrete structure over a wooden replica of the Daigo-ji Temple in Kyoto, as he felt the replica would be out of place in the modernist Japan Center. The designer, noted modernist architect Yoshirō Taniguchi, rejected the typical square or octagonal-roofed pagoda in favor of a circular roof, which he stated was inspired by the Million Pagoda (Hyakumantō), a miniature pagoda design that was placed in ten temples by Empress Kōken in approximately 770 A.D.

The Peace Pagoda is 100 feet (30 m) tall with five distinct stories. The Pagoda uses twelve vertical reinforced concrete pillars to support five copper-clad conical roofs which decrease in diameter from 46 feet (14 m) (for the lowest roof, closest to the ground) to 34 feet (10 m) (for the uppermost roof). Each pillar is 65 feet (20 m) tall and weighs 12 short tons (11 t). As typical of a Japanese pagoda, above the uppermost roof is the sōrin finial, consisting of a nine-ringed bronze spire (kurin) topped by a golden flaming head (hoshu), which is in turn topped by a ball. The kurin was cast locally in Berkeley. The interior of the first story was intended to be lined with mother-of-pearl, and also was to include a symbolic image of Peace encrusted with cultured pearls from Japan. Finishes and decorative materials were sourced from Japan, and the reinforced concrete structure would be cast at the site in San Francisco. T.Y. Lin was retained as a structural consultant. The total cost of the Pagoda was $185,000.

=== Plaza ===
Peace Plaza measures 160 by 197 feet (49 by 60 m), and the Peace Pagoda is in the southwestern corner of the Plaza. As originally designed and constructed, the Peace Pagoda stood in a keyhole-shaped reflecting pool. Per Taniguchi, "... as night draws on, the whole structure will look extremely picturesque with the illumination shedding its soft light on the Pagoda. It looks as if the Pagoda is carved in relief against the nocturnal sky and floating on water in a fairy land." Stones and rocks arranged in the pool were also shipped from Japan. A granite bridge leading to the east from the center of the Pagoda provided pedestrian access over the pool. Another reflecting pool, at the northern edge of the Peace Plaza, was adjacent to a covered walkway connecting the Miyako (West) and Kintetsu (East) Malls.

However, due to poor drainage, the reflecting pools around the Pagoda and north edge of the Plaza were kept dry as early as 1971, since water kept leaking into the Japan Center Garage underneath the Plaza. The pools were permanently drained in 1990 and the group Friends of Japantown Peace Plaza held a contest to redesign the Plaza, selecting Kimio Kimura as the landscape architect to design a garden using existing planters and structures. In 1995, the Board of Supervisors allocated $600,000 for renovations, and Friends of Japantown Peace Plaza retained the architectural firm HOK to rehabilitate the Plaza and address continued leakage into the Garage.

A new wall was installed along Geary, at the south edge of the Plaza, by May 2000, and the San Francisco Department of Public Works (DPW) took over redesign and rehabilitation of the Plaza. DPW selected architect Kenji Murokami to redesign the Plaza, and two stones were relocated from the reflecting pool: one, which had previously held the English-language dedication plaque, was moved to the northeast corner (near Post); and the other is adjacent to the new red-tiled wall in the southeast corner. The reflecting pools along Post and the covered walkway were also removed at this time. These renovations were completed in 2001.

After the redesign, there are eight steps leading to the center of the Pagoda: three steps in a large outer concrete circle; three steps in a smaller pentagonal concrete platform; and two steps within the base formed by the twelve vertical pillars. A waterfall wall is west of the Pagoda, lettered with the sign "Japantown Peace Plaza" and an eternal flame is encased in glass near the north end of the wall. A 9 ft (2.7 m) tall monument was added in 2005 to commemorate the contributions of Japanese Americans to the north edge of the Plaza; it is one of three monuments placed in California Japantowns by SB307.

=== Peace Pagodas ===
A Peace Pagoda is a Buddhist stupa; a monument to inspire peace, designed to provide a focus for people of all races and creeds, and to help unite them in their search for world peace.

The San Francisco Peace Pagoda was designed as a five-tiered concrete stupa. Unlike most peace pagodas, this one was not constructed by the Buddhist order Nipponzan Myohoji, which had begun to construct these monuments fourteen years earlier. However, Nipponzan welcomed the pagoda and established a temple in the city.

=== Yoshirō Taniguchi ===
The designer of the San Francisco Peace Pagoda, Yoshirō Taniguchi, was a noted Japanese modernist architect who also designed the National Museum of Modern Art, the Imperial Theatre and the Hotel Okura, which all opened in Tokyo during the 1960s. He was a graduate of the University of Tokyo and the father of architect Yoshio Taniguchi, known for the 2004 redesign of the New York Museum of Modern Art.

== Gallery ==
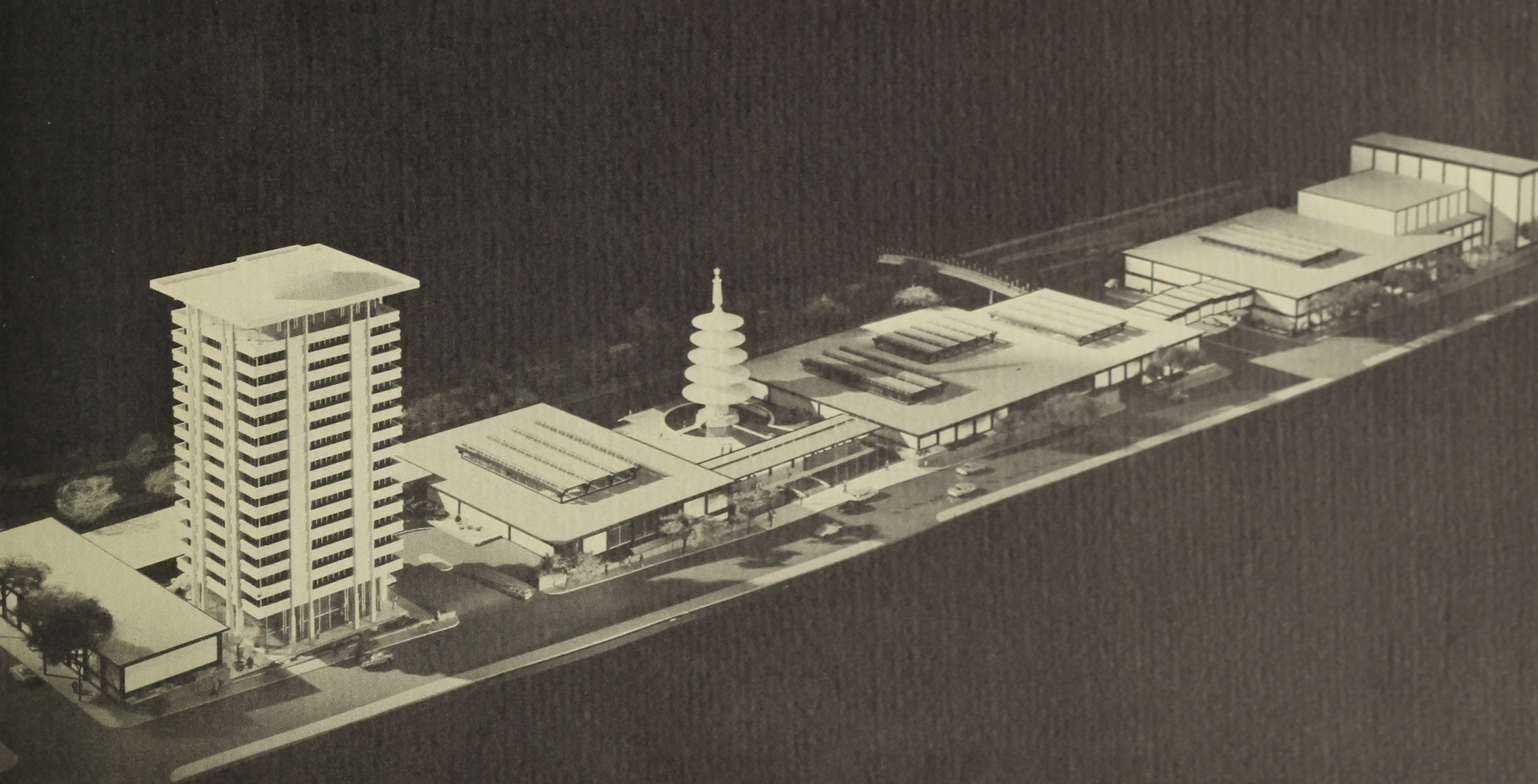
Architectural model of Japan Center, looking south from Post (1965)

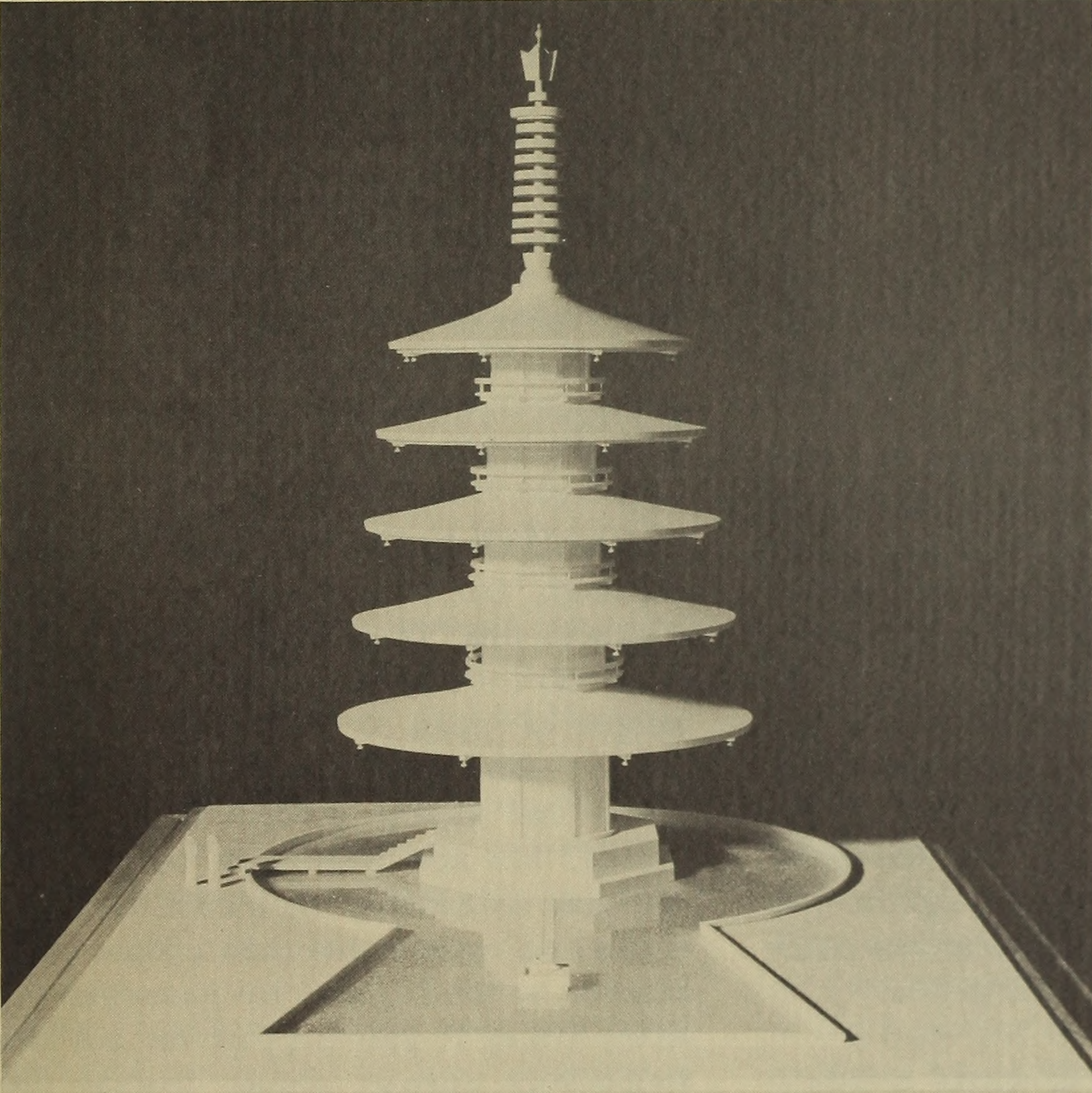
Architectural model of the Pagoda (1965)

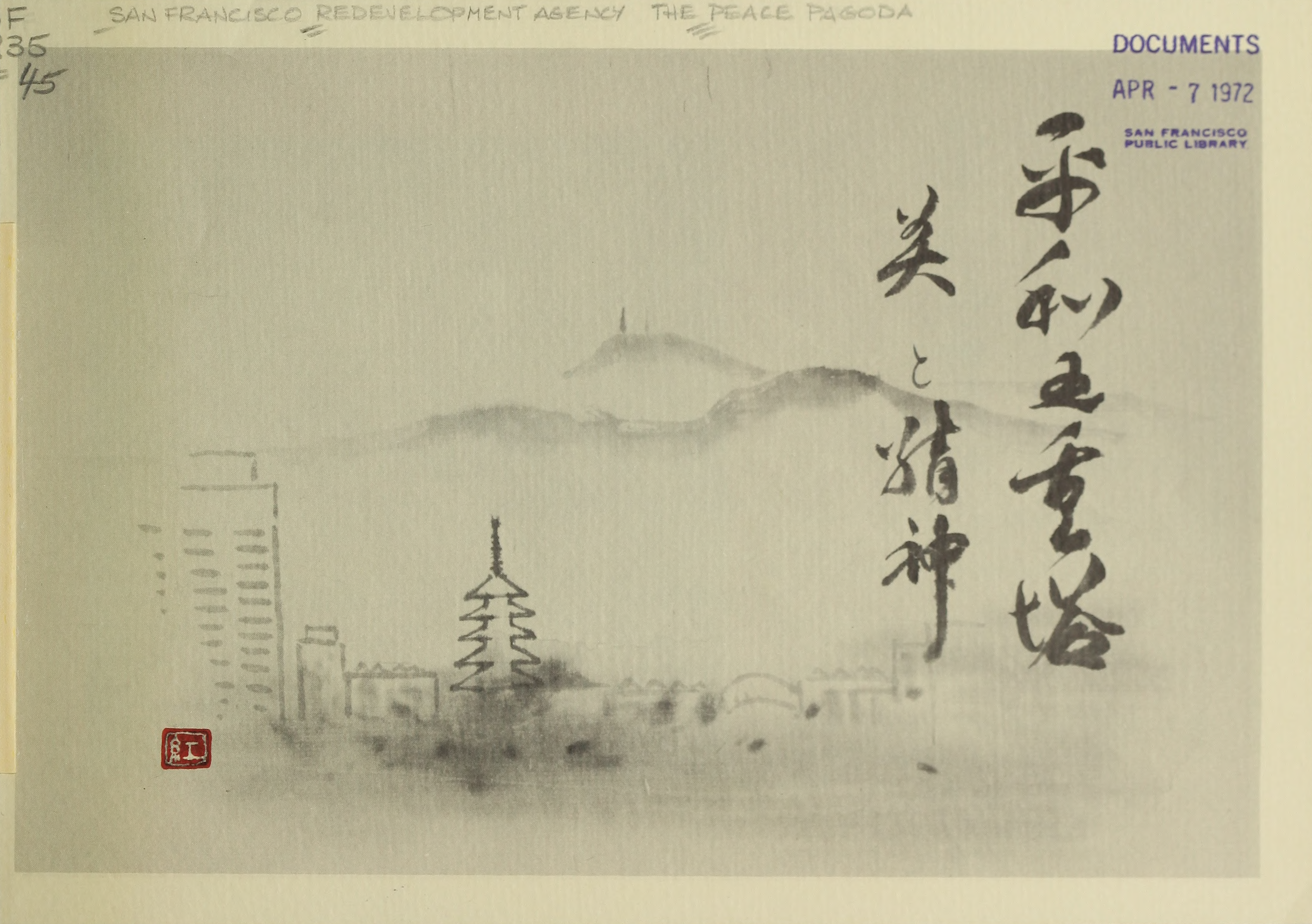
Sumi-e by Masae Yamamoto (1965)

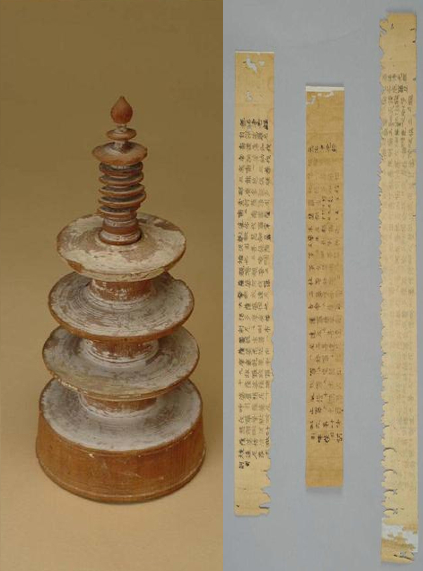
Hyakumantō Darani, the 770 A.D. inspiration for the Peace Pagoda

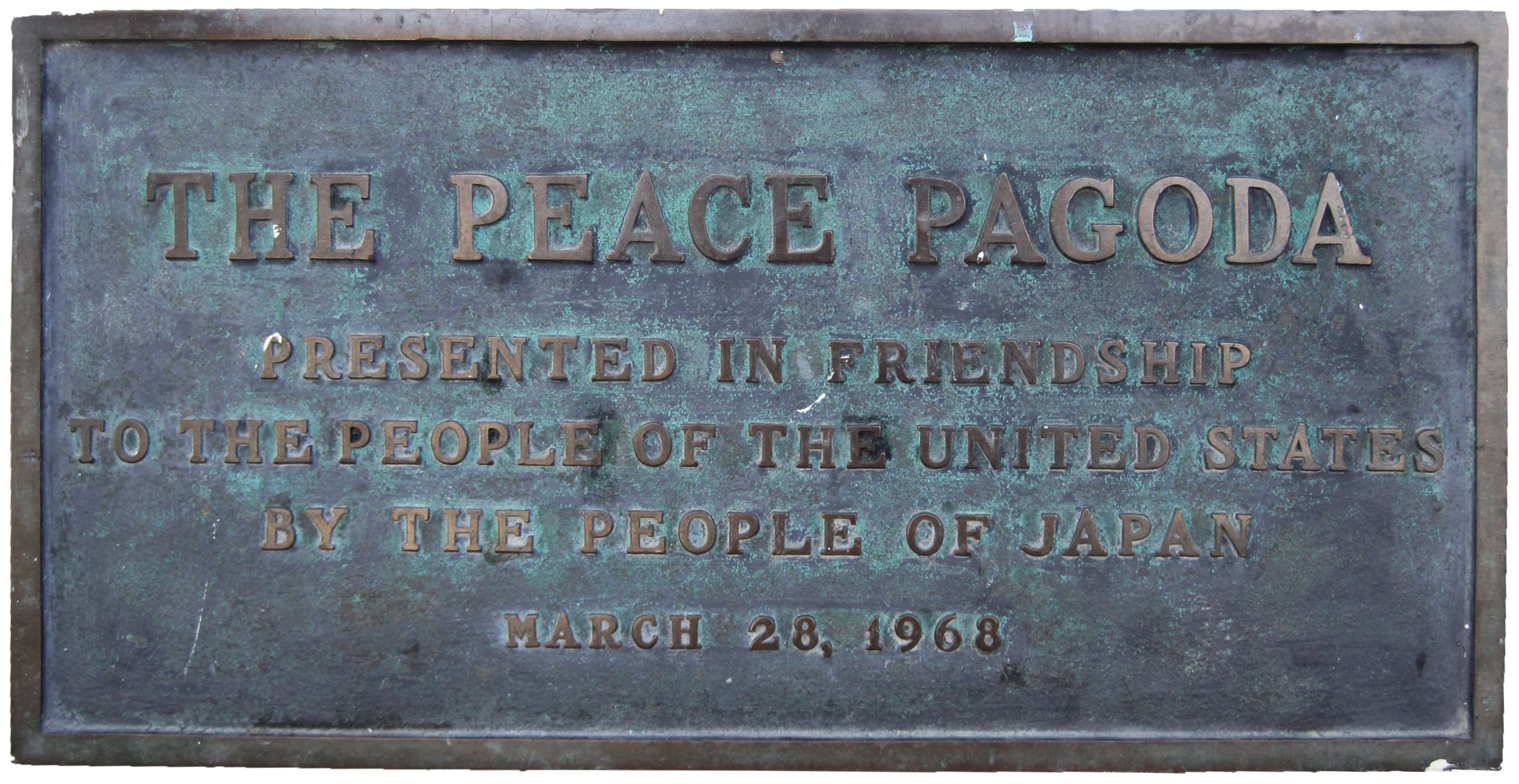
Plaque transcription: The Peace Pagoda
Presented in friendship to the people of the United States by the people of Japan
March 28, 1968

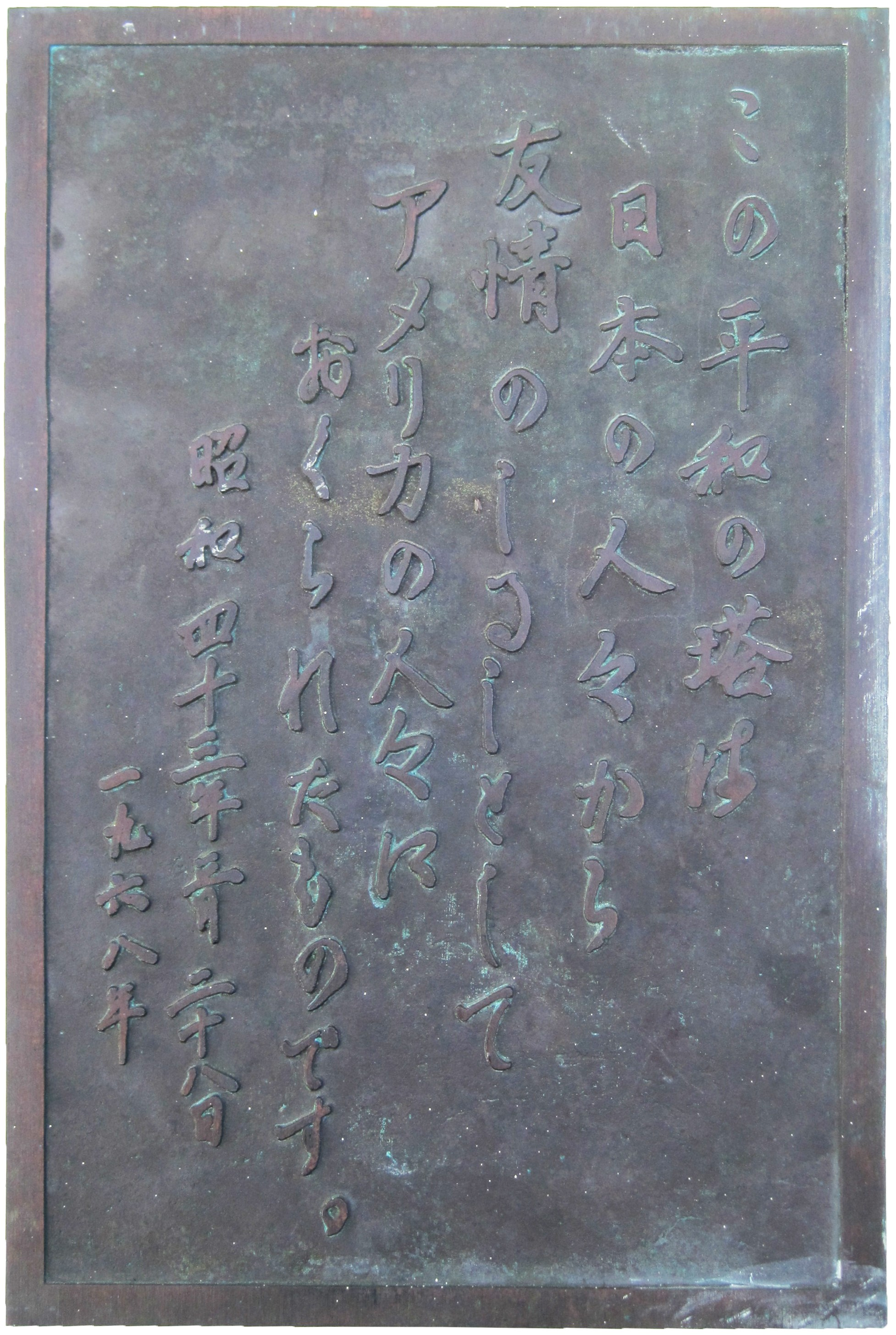
Plaque in Japanese, on one pillar

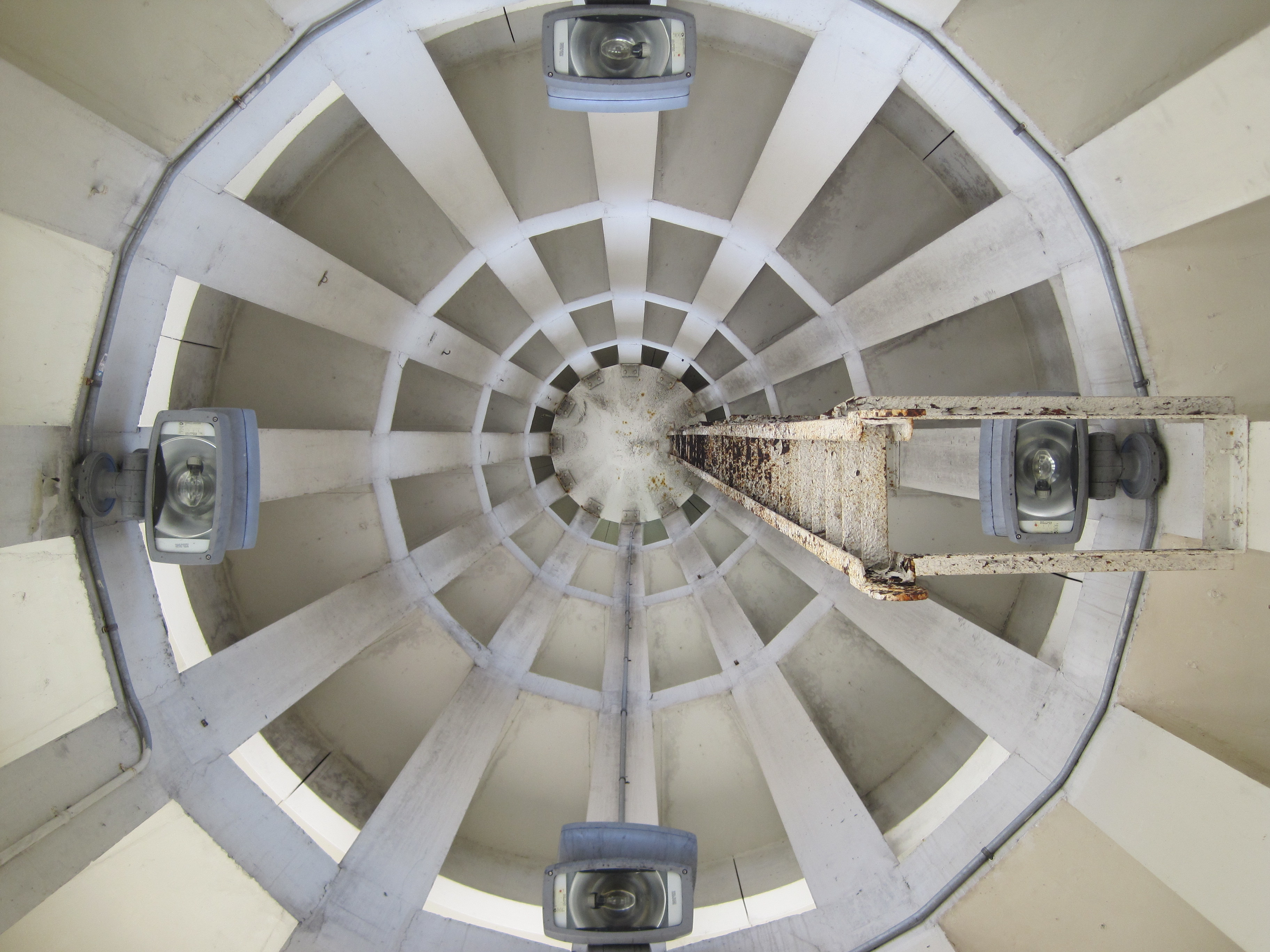
The underside of the San Francisco Peace Pagoda

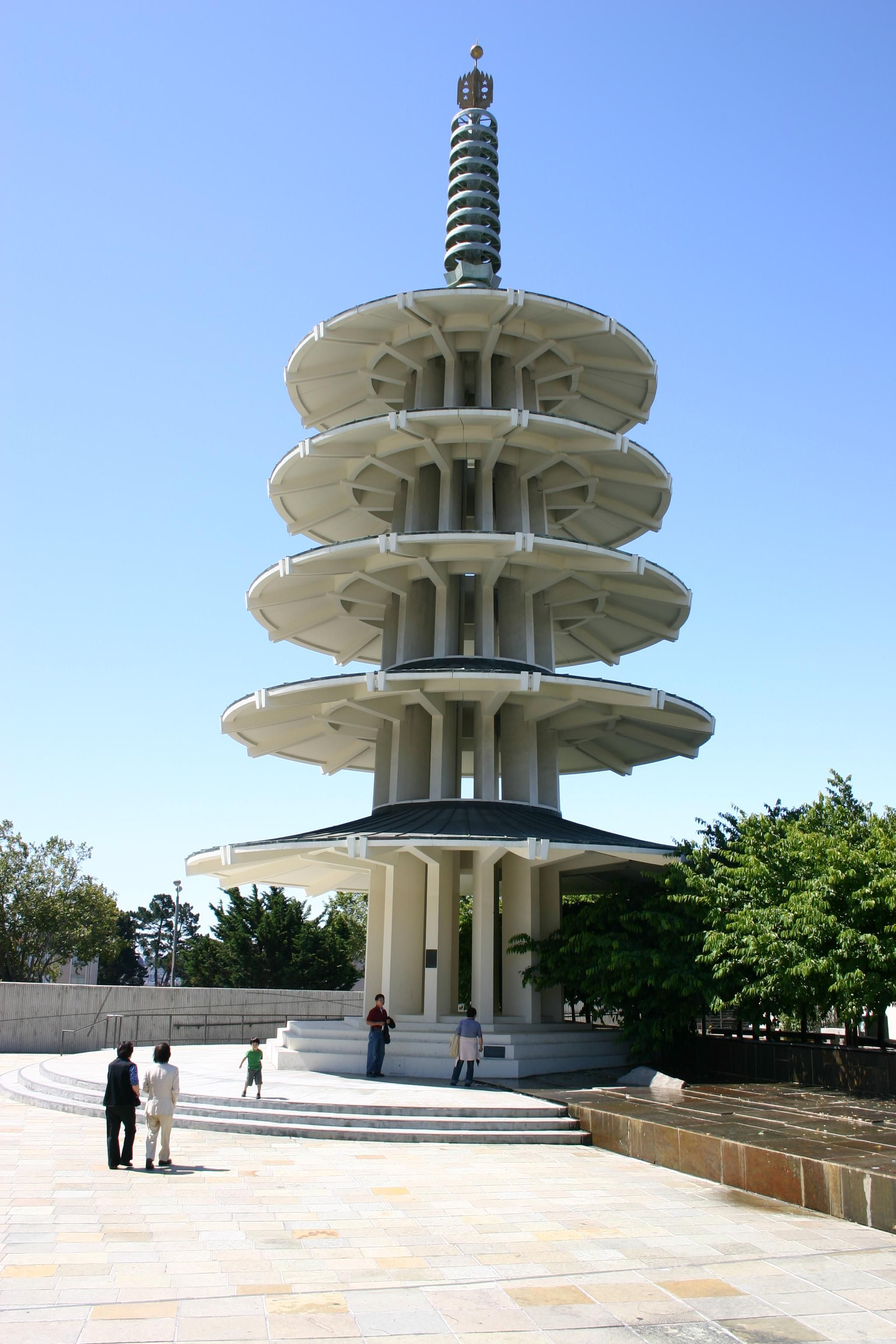
Image with people, for scale of height.

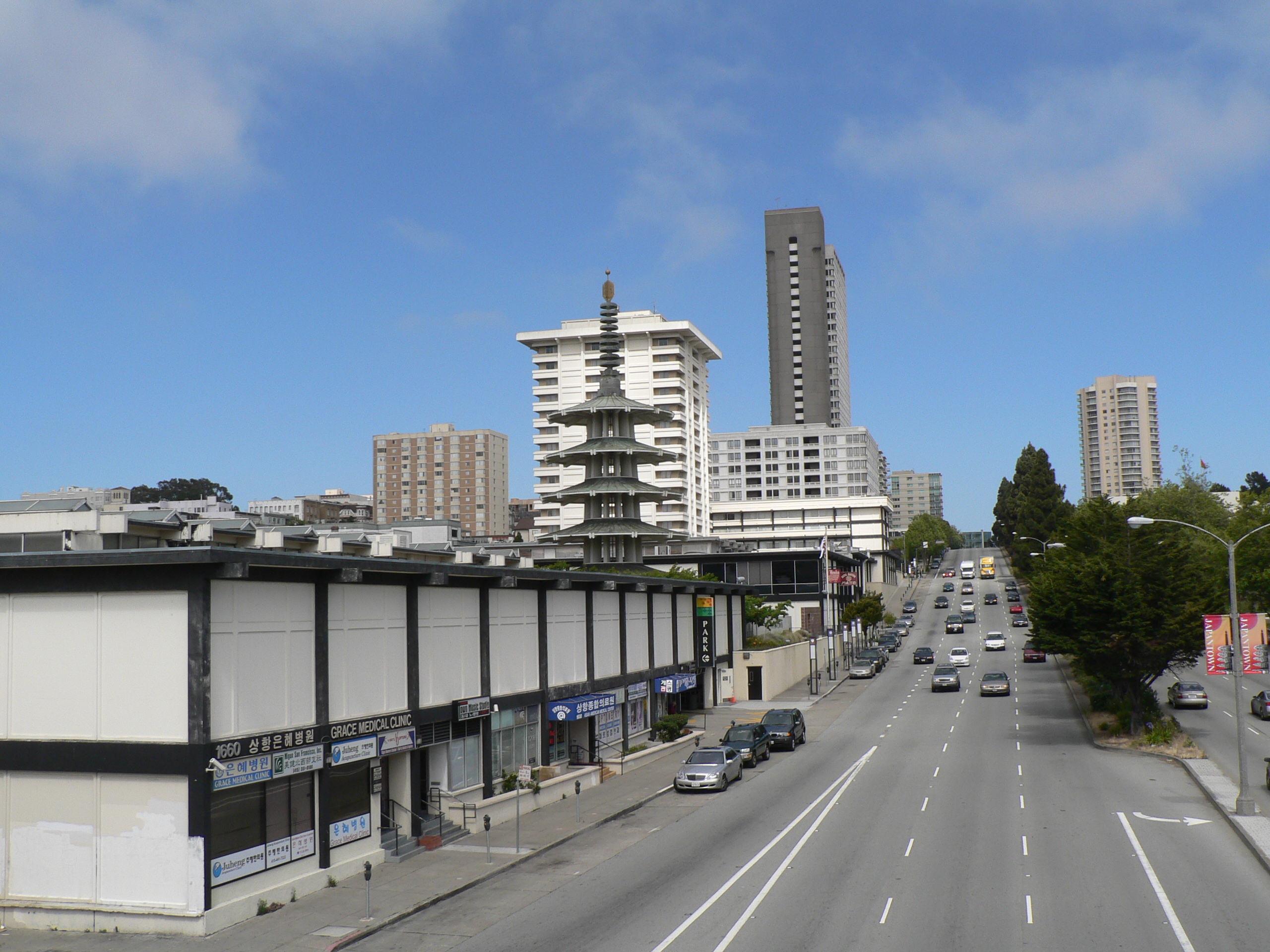
Visible from Geary

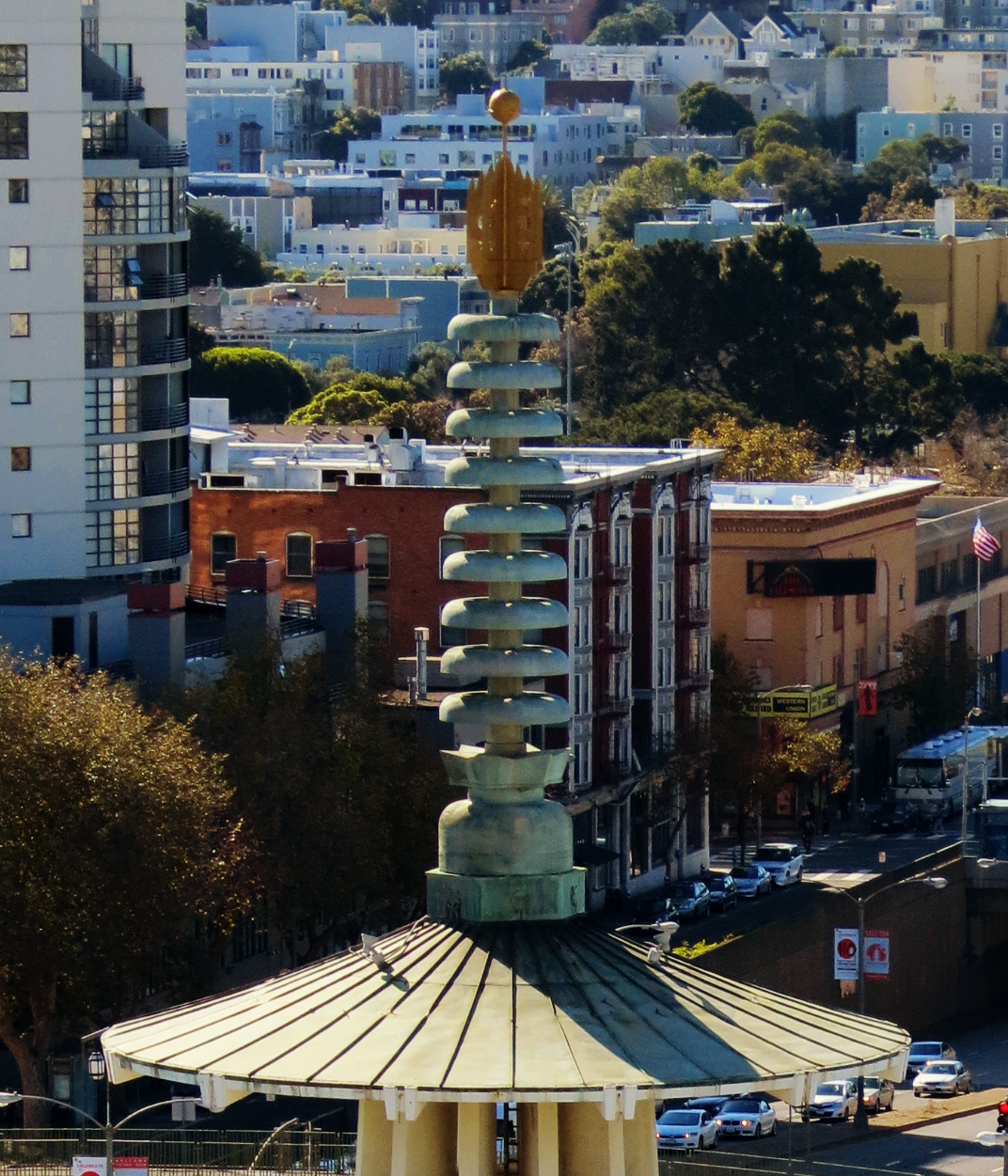
sōrin finial detail

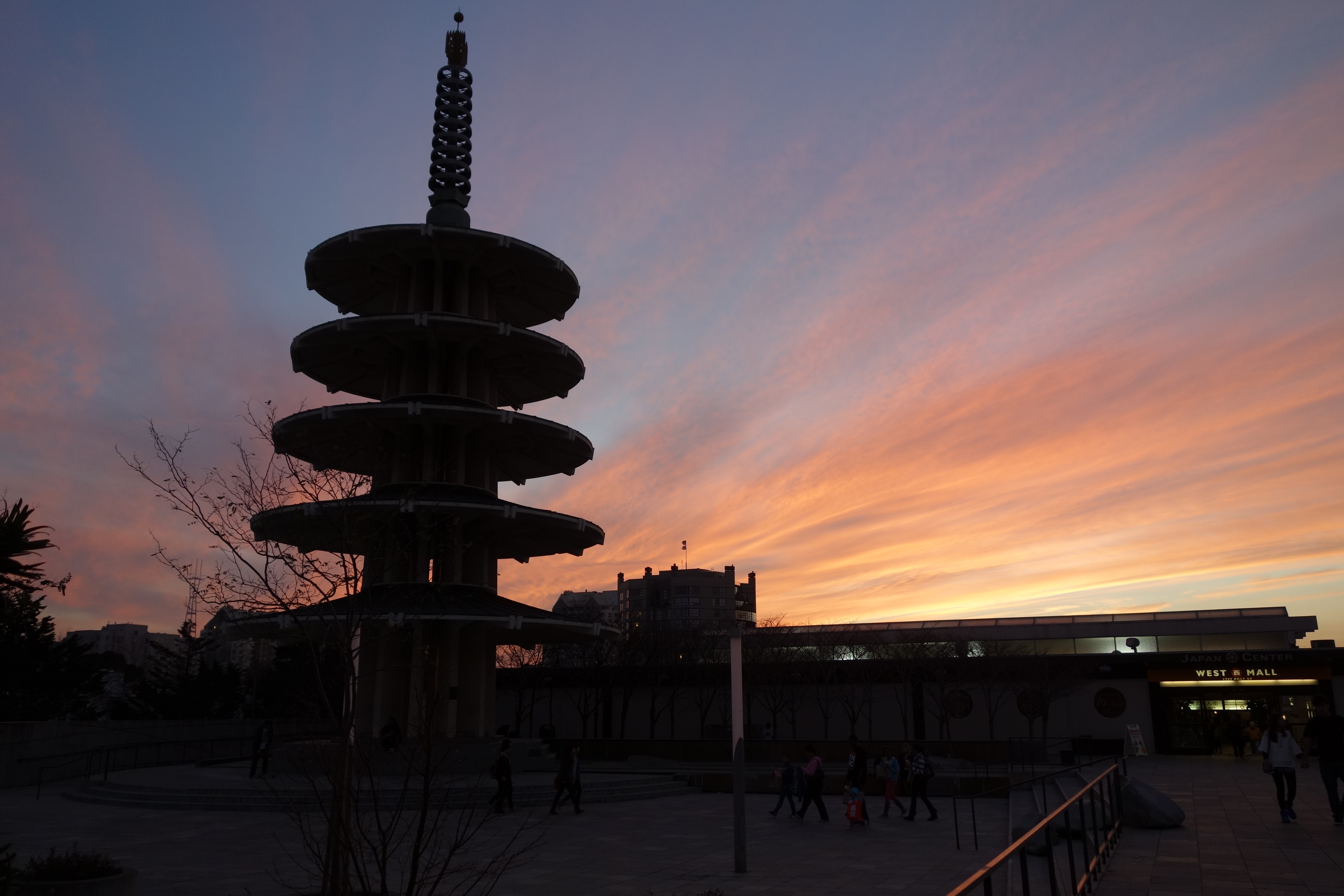
Sunset silhouette

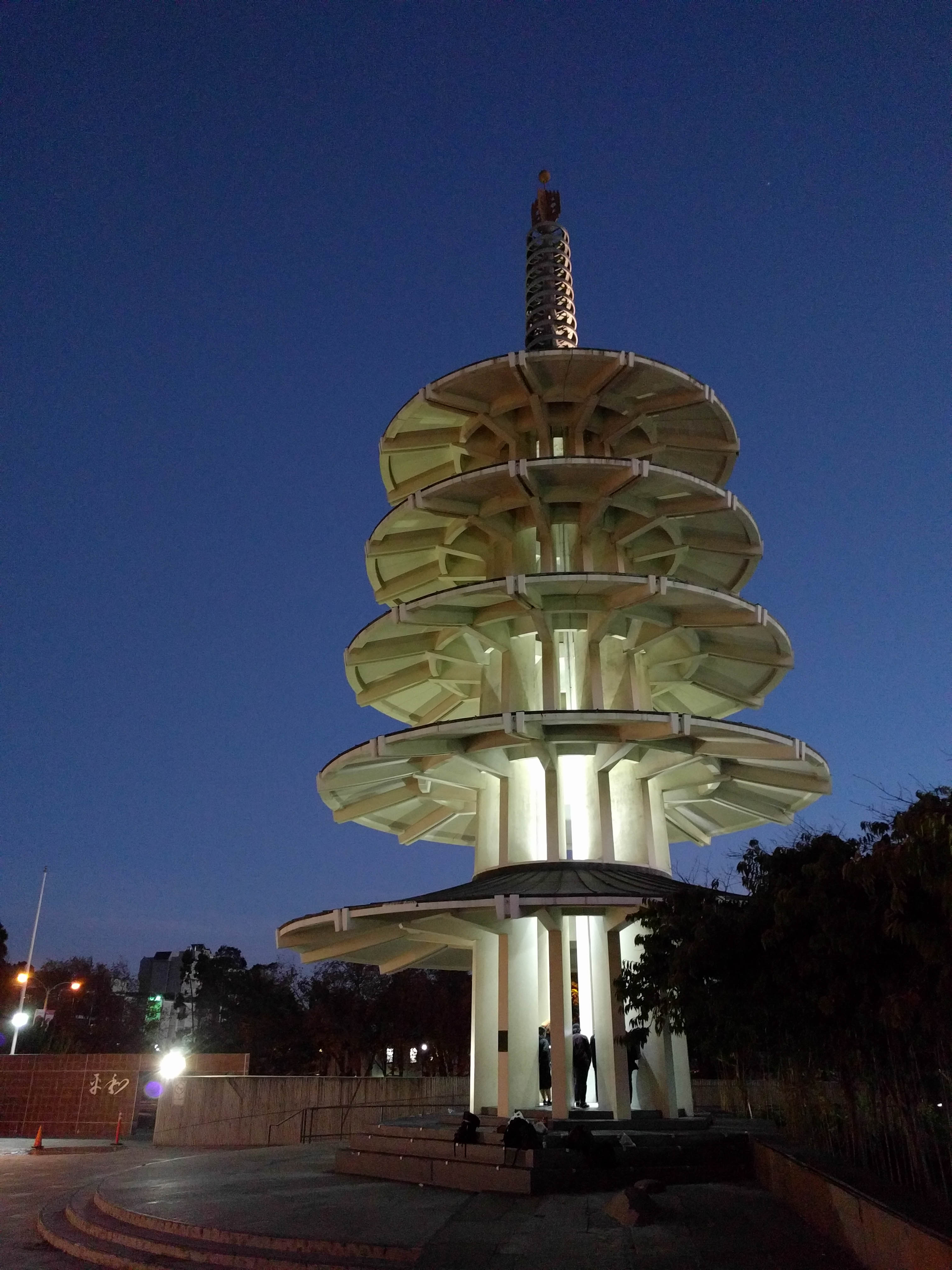
Interior, lit at night
