= Yoshirō Taniguchi =

Japanese architect (1904–1979)

- Born: 24 June 1904; Kanazawa, Japan
- Died: 2 February 1979 (aged 74); Tokyo, Japan
- Occupation: Architect

Yoshirō Taniguchi (谷口 吉郎, Taniguchi Yoshirō; 24 June 1904 – 2 February 1979) was a Japanese architect. He was born in the city of Kanazawa, Ishikawa Prefecture, Japan. He was a graduate of Tokyo University Department of Architecture and professor at Tokyo Institute of Technology from 1929–1965. As an architect, he created over 50 buildings and 10 memorials and participated in many professional activities as a statesman of Japanese modern architecture. “Yoshirō Taniguchi must be regarded as one of the most widely known, and, in the best sense, popular architects in Japan. Taniguchi is also well known for his writings and has made a name for himself as a designer of tombs, monuments and memorials which are all exquisite in themselves and suited to their surroundings.”

== Biography ==
Taniguchi's career bridges traditional Japanese building and the shift to western modernism.

By the time he entered Tokyo University in 1925, he had already seen the old architectural world of Tokyo give way to the new revivalist style coming from across the ocean including Frank Lloyd Wright's Imperial Hotel, or worse, crumble to the ground in a series of terrible earthquakes, culminating with the great Kanto earthquake of 1923.

He searched for a new way of building that would be capable of surviving such devastation, one in which European engineering and construction technologies promised great freedoms and advances, along which with came new styles. But in a country that had set its sights on modernization, it was the modern architectural movement, especially the International Style from Germany, which so impressed Taniguchi that he undertook a journey there, invited to design the garden for the Japanese Embassy under the guidance of notorious German architect Albert Speer.

In Germany, Taniguchi was much impressed by the severe classicism of Karl Friedrick Schinkel whose formalism shared a minimalist quality with Speer's work, all in the service of projects such as museums, halls, monuments.

With the outbreak of war in Europe, Taniguchi returned to Tokyo on the Yasukuni-maru, the last ship to sail for Japan from Europe during the war, only to see his own country drawn into the same war he was fleeing, and once again, to see it destroyed even more completely than all the earthquakes before and after.

Following 1947, Taniguchi sought an architectural approach suited to Japan’s cultural buildings, concluding that contemporary European styles were not entirely applicable. His work attempted to synthesize various influences, including traditional Japanese craft aesthetics and the "universal" classicism of ancient Greece. He also drew from German architectural developments—ranging from Schinkel to the institutional structures of Speer—and the International Style projects of Le Corbusier and Mies van der Rohe. Furthermore, he incorporated the urban planning ideals of the Bauhaus. A central focus of his work was the application of steel and concrete to create modern, earthquake-resistant structures.

In a country that had become infatuated with the modern style, Taniguchi began to be the iconoclast. “His work was always in conscious contrast to that of modernists such as Maekawa and Tange, and he continually broadened the possible range of modern architectural vocabulary in Japan.” Taniguchi's idea of modernism reflected the Meiji era approach to the traditional culture of Japan by which even Greek classicism could be seen as modern. “Corbusier and the modern architecture influenced Taniguchi, but he is also in sympathy with Classical, particularly Renaissance, architecture.” It is for this reason that Taniguchi straddles the spectrum from traditional to modern and makes it difficult to place him specifically at any one point leading some to see him as “a link between the newer school of modern architects and the more conservative school that based its work more directly on Japanese vernacular traditions.”

Taniguchi's work took the form largely of projects in the public realm, with a focus on cultural entities which not only had to serve important practical functions but which also were burdened with conveying Japan's cultural wisdom, both looking back at a lost and tragic history as well as looking to instill new ideals and a promise of the future. There was no better place to do so than in the educational sector and he was embraced by several universities to produce a number of buildings for their newly re-built and growing campuses, as well as many of the museums, theaters, cultural centers, and monuments that would become important parts of the new Tokyo.

In the course of re-building, Taniguchi came to realize the importance of saving the remnants of the traditional buildings of Japan, and in 1952, he became an active participant in the historical preservation movement, joining Japan's Cultural Properties Specialists Council as well as the Japan Agency for Cultural Affairs. One of his lesser known undertakings was the creation, in 1965, of the Meiji Mura Village, a vast compound north of Nagoya dedicated to the re-construction and salvage of the great and typical buildings of the Japan that inspired him, the Meiji era and modern works that typified the Japanese interpretation of western architecture, including Frank Lloyd Wright's own Imperial Hotel, demolished in 1968 and carefully re-built at Meiji Mura, piece by piece, under Taniguchi's direction.

Taniguchi is the father of Yoshio Taniguchi who, despite having designed numerous significant buildings in Tokyo, is best known for another great monument to modernism, the 2004 re-design of the Museum of Modern Art in New York.

== Notable works ==
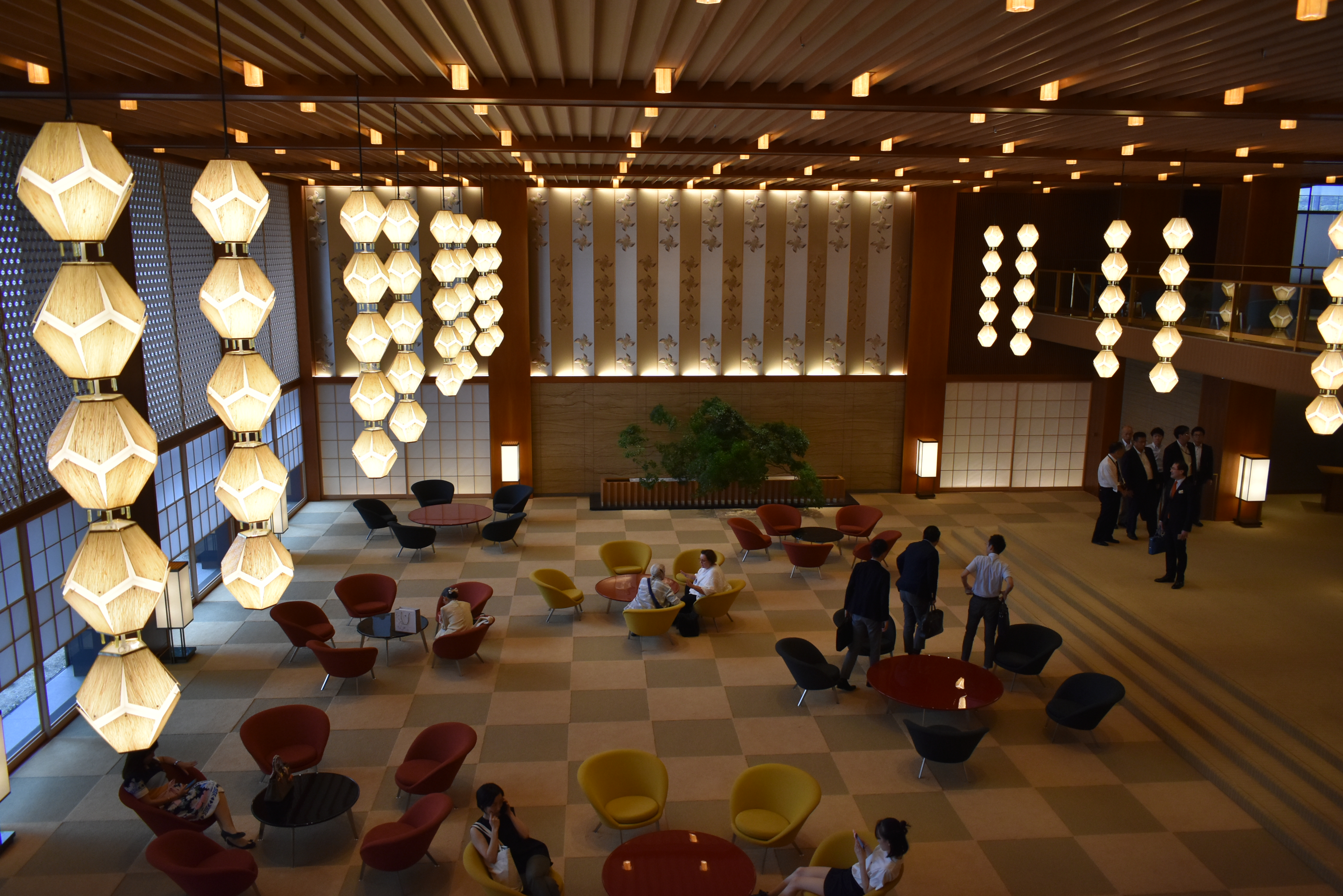
Hotel Okura Tokyo lobby, originally built in 1962

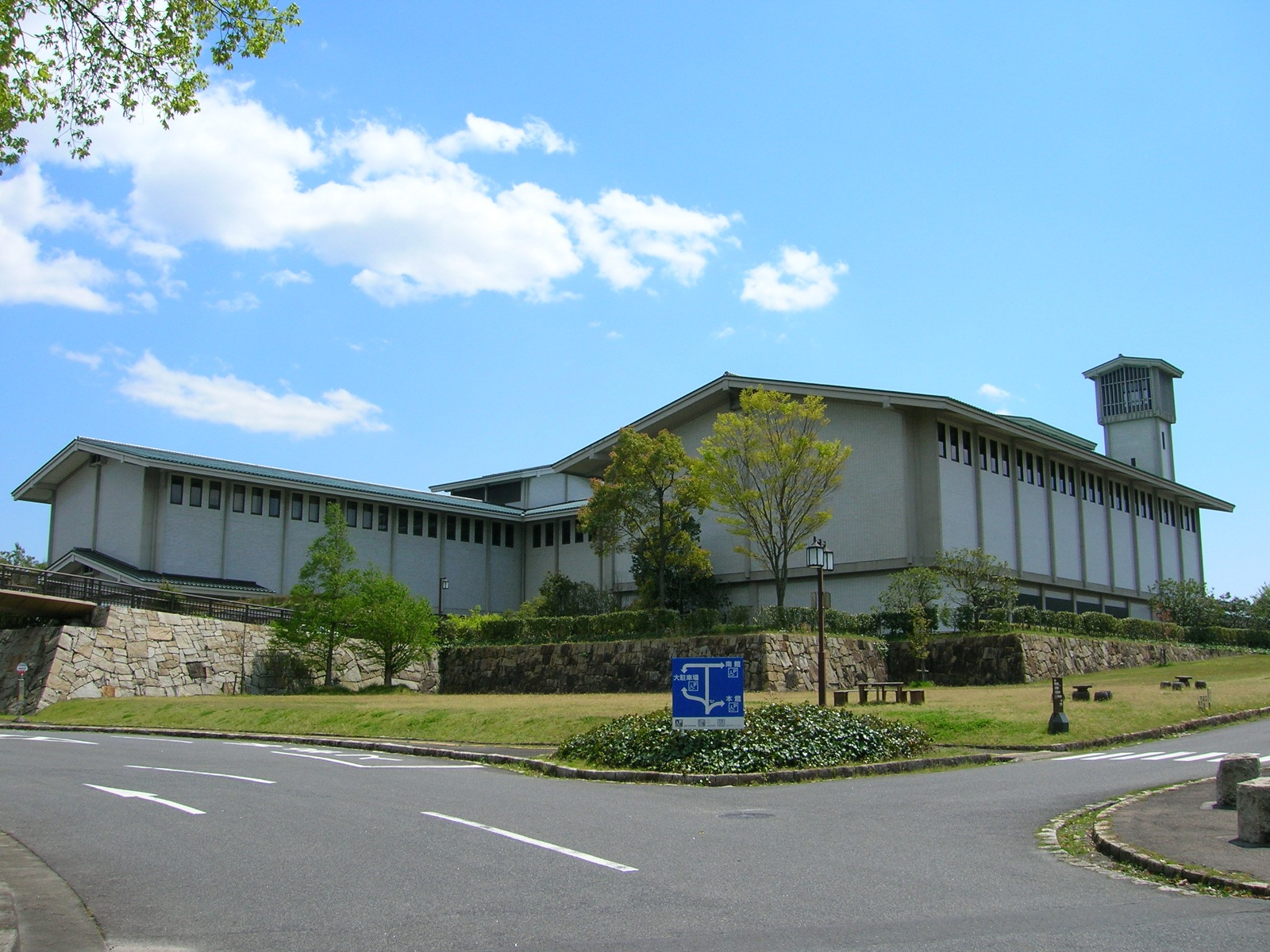
Aichi Prefectural Ceramic Museum main building, constructed in the late 1970's

- 1932 Hydraulics Laboratory Tokyo Technical Institute, Tokyo
- 1937 Keio University: Yochisha Elementary School Main Building & Hiyoshi Dormitory, Tokyo
- 1947 Memorial Hall for Toson Shimazaki, Magome, Gifu
- 1949 Keio University: Student Hall & Third School Building, Tokyo
- 1952 Keio University Shin Banraisha, Tokyo
- 1952 Ishikawa Textile Center, Kanazawa City
- 1956 Chichibu Cement Factory, Saitama
- 1958 Tokyo Tech 70th Anniversary Auditorium (Cultural Asset), Tokyo
- 1958 Komoro City Fujimura Memorial Hall, Nagano
- 1958 Hara Kei Memorial Museum, Morioka City, Iwate
- 1959 Ishikawa Traditional Crafts Center, Kanazawa City
- 1959 Chidorigafuchi War Memorial Rokkakudo, Tokyo
- 1959 Togu Palace, Tokyo
- 1962 Hotel Okura, Tokyo
- 1962 Bunkyo Ogai Memorial Library, Tokyo
- 1966 Yamatane Art Museum, Tokyo
- 1966 Imperial Theater, Tokyo
- 1968 Tokyo National Museum Toyokan Building, Tokyo
- 1968 San Francisco Peace Pagoda, San Francisco, CA, USA
- 1969 National Museum of Modern Art (MOMAT), Tokyo
- 1974 Imperial Guest House, Tokyo - Restoration
- 1977 Crafts Gallery of National Museum of Modern Art - Restoration
- 1978 Tamagawa Library, Kanazawa City - Restoration
- 1978 Aichi Prefectural Ceramic Museum, Seto, Aichi
- 1983 Reimeikan Museum, Kagoshima - (Posthumous)
