= Dori Friend =

American internet entrepreneur, media creator, and activist (born 1960)

Dori Friend is an American Internet entrepreneur, digital marketing expert, author, film maker, speaker and LGBTQ+ rights activist. She is the owner of SEONitro, PageOneEngine and Raven Bear Labs.

Friend was born in San Francisco, California on August 29, 1960. She attended public school and then attended the University of California, Berkeley, from which she graduated in 1984 with a degree in Art/Art Studies.

== Career ==
Dori Friend was a Human Interface Designer for Apple Vision Software Team, working on products for the MAC operating system and as a part of the team that created the first digital interface for cameras.

She was involved in developing the software Hypercard, and MACINFO in 1985. After leaving Apple Inc., Friend started her first online business in 2000, called TheLogoGuru.com.

In 2007, Dori Friend formed SEONitro, LLC, a company that builds software for reverse engineering Web search engine ranking algorithms and automating processes for search engine optimization. Friend has become an industry authority on search engine optimization and speaks on the topic at Internet marketing and SEO events regularly.

In 2015, she launched PageOneEngine, an interactive digital marketing education course, software application toolkit and community.

In 2016, she formed Raven Bear Labs to develop and test software that creates unique and customized user experiences on the Internet.

Dori Friend is a speaker at various Internet marketing and tech conferences, including Yanik Silver Underground, and Inbox Blueprint Live. She is a member of the Maverick 1000, an invitation-only group of entrepreneurs worth or earning more than $1 million. She is the founder and organizer of annual SEORockstars Internet marketers' networking events.

== Books ==
Dori Friend is the author of Where The Big Dogs Roam: The 8 Magical Ways to Quit Your Day Job by Mastering the Search Engines, an eBook published on June 20, 2015.

== LGBTQ+ social activism ==
Dori Friend has been active in the LGBT social movement since the 1980s. She co-founded the Gay and Lesbian Artists Alliance (GLAA) in San Francisco, CA with Richard Bolingbroke in 1989.

In 1990, she co-curated "The Lesbian and Gay Fine Art Exhibit" with Richard Bolingbroke in San Francisco, CA.

In the early 1990s, Dori Friend and Pasty Northcutt began documenting the 100-year Gay rights movement in a historical documentary film titled “Over The Rainbow”. The film was showcased at film festivals beginning in 1998, including the third annual Phoenix Lesbian and Gay Film Festival.

Friend was the creator and Director of PrideRide 2000, a 3,300-mile bicycle trek across the United States, intended to put a face to Gay, Lesbian, Bisexual and Transgender people in cities and towns across California, Arizona, New Mexico, Texas, Louisiana, Mississippi, Alabama, Georgia, South Carolina, North Carolina, Virginia and Washington D.C.

She contributed to the oral history collection for the Online Archive of California, a collection of over 500 oral histories that have been collected by the GLBT Historical Society.

Dori Friend has also been a donor for the San Francisco AIDS Foundation.

== Personal life ==
Dori Friend participated in the Great Alaska Bike Trek in 1982, a 4,400-mile bicycle trip organized by the Mental Health Association of San Francisco to raise funds for its chapters in Canada and the U.S.

She currently lives in Amador County, California.

== Publications ==
- Where The Big Dogs Roam: The 8 Magical Ways to Quit Your Day Job by Mastering the Search Engines (ebook) (2015)
