= Timeline of San Francisco =

Coordinates: 37.783333°N 122.416667°W

The following is a timeline of the history of the city of San Francisco, California, United States.

== Prior to the 1800s ==
- 1776 – Presidio of San Francisco and Mission San Francisco de Asís established by colonists from Spain.
- 1791 – Mission San Francisco de Asís building dedicated.

== 1800s ==
- 1833
  - Mexican Secularization Act of 1833: Mission Dolores begins process of shutting down, San Francisco opened up to civilian settlement.
- 1834
  - The pueblo of Yerba Buena founded, Francisco de Haro becomes first alcalde.
- 1847
  - Yerba Buena renamed "San Francisco."
  - The City Hotel built by William Leidesdorff.
- 1848
  - Territory ceded from Mexico to the United States per Treaty of Guadalupe Hidalgo.
  - California Gold Rush begins.
- 1849
  - July 15: Little Chile attacked by The Hounds gang.
  - St. Francis hotel built.
  - Boudin Bakery, Olympic Amphitheatre, and Union Iron Works in business.
  - West Indian Benevolent Association established.
- 1850
  - April 15: City of San Francisco incorporated.
  - May 1: John W. Geary becomes mayor.
  - October 29: San Francisco becomes part of the new U.S. State of California.
  - Chamber of Commerce Society of California Pioneers, and Jenny Lind Theatre established.
  - Population: 34,000.
- 1851
  - May 3–4: Fire.
  - San Francisco Committee of Vigilance organized.
  - Pioneer Race Course opens.
- 1852
  - Ghirardelli in business.
  - Mercantile Library Association of San Francisco, Sons of the Emerald Isle, and San Francisco Turn Verein established.
  - The Golden Era newspaper begins publication.
- 1853 – California Academy of Sciences, YMCA, and Russ garden established.
- 1854
  - San Francisco Mechanics' Institute established.
  - Lone Mountain Cemetery established
- 1855 – Hebrew Young Men's Literary Assoc. active.
- 1856 – Mirror of the Times and Daily Morning Call newspapers begin publication.
- 1857 – California State Convention of Colored Citizens, a colored convention, held in city.
- 1858 – Italian Benevolent Society organized.
- 1859 – San Francisco Schuetzen-Verein founded.
- 1860
  - March 27: Japanese embassy arrives.
  - Olympic Club founded.
  - Population: 56,802.
- 1861
  - Overland Telegraph Company begins operating (New York-San Francisco).
  - Fraternitas Rosae Crucis lodge established.
- 1862
  - Heald's Business College and Franchise League established.
  - The San Francisco Stock and Bond Exchange was founded.
- 1863
  - San Francisco and San Jose Railroad begins operating soon.
  - St. Andrew's Society founded.
  - Cliff House rebuilt.
  - Charlotte L. Brown sues a racially segregated San Francisco streetcar company and wins.
- 1864 –
  - Concordia-Argonaut Club founded.
  - Hugh Toland found the Toland Medical College, which would later become the University of California, San Francisco
- 1865 – Daily Examiner and Daily Dramatic Chronicle newspapers begin publication.
- 1866 – Merchants' Exchange Association, Caledonian Club, and Woodward's Gardens established.
- 1867
  - Street begging ban effected.
  - San Francisco City and County Almshouse opens.
- 1868 – San Francisco County Medical Society and Women's Co-operative Printing Office established.
- 1869
  - California Theatre opens.
  - San Francisco Yacht Club founded.
  - Grand hotel built.
  - Central Pacific Railroad line to Oakland completed.
- 1870
  - Golden Gate Park and San Francisco Microscopical Society established.
  - Population: 149,473.
- 1871 – San Francisco Art Association and St. Luke's Hospital established.
- 1872 – Bohemian Club and Bar Association of San Francisco founded.
- 1873
  - Clay Street Hill Railroad begins operating.
  - Polish Society of California organized.
- 1874 – California School of Design, and Territorial Pioneers of California established.
- 1875
  - Palace Hotel in business.
  - Fire patrol established.
- 1876
  - Pioneer Park, Pacific Homeopathic Dispensary Association, and Ligue Nationale Francaise established.
  - Railway connexion to Los Angeles.
- 1877
  - Board of Trade, Spanish Mutual Benevolent Society, and Workingmen's Party of California established.
  - Anti-Chinese sentiment leads to riots against Chinatown residents and businesses.
  - Baldwin hotel built.
- 1878 – San Francisco Public Library, Pacific Yacht Club, and Young Women's Christian Association founded.
- 1879 – Golden Gate Kindergarten Association organized.
- 1880 – California State Convention of Colored Citizens, a colored convention, held in city.
- 1881 – Geographical Society of the Pacific organized.
- 1883 – Pacific Coast Amateur Photographic Association headquartered in city.
- 1887 – Cogswell Polytechnical College established.
- 1888 – Associated Charities and San Francisco Business College established.
- 1889 – Pacific-Union Club formed.
- 1890
  - California Camera Club and University Club of San Francisco established.
  - Population: 298,997.
  - Grand Conservatory of Music is established by Eugene S. Bonelli
- 1891 – Gregg Shorthand school established.
- 1892
  - Hibernia Bank built.
  - Trocadero Hotel opens.
- 1893 – Mark Hopkins Institute of Art established.
- 1894
  - Wilmerding School of Industrial Arts established.
  - California Midwinter International Exposition of 1894 held; Japanese Tea Garden built.
- 1895
  - California School of Mechanical Arts established.
  - M. H. de Young Memorial Museum opens as Golden Gate Park Museum.
- 1896 – Sutro Baths open.
- 1898
  - San Francisco Ferry Building opens.
  - City rechartered.
  - League of California Municipalities headquartered in city.
  - Buddhist temple founded.
- 1899
  - San Francisco State Normal School established.
  - City Hall built.
- 1900 – Population: 342,782.

== 1900s ==
=== 1900s–1940s ===
- 1901
  - Labor strike of restaurant workers.
  - San Francisco Architectural Club organized.
- 1902 – Eugene Schmitz becomes mayor.
- 1905 – 1908: San Francisco graft trials
- 1906 – April 18: Earthquake and fires.
- 1907
  - July: Mayor Eugene Schmitz imprisoned.
  - International Hotel built.
  - A. Mutt comic strip begins publication in the San Francisco Chronicle.
- 1908 – South San Francisco incorporated near city.
- 1910
  - San Francisco Housing Association organized.
  - Population: 416,912.
- 1911
  - Cort Theatre opens on September 2, 1911.
  - San Francisco Symphony founded. Plays first concert at Cort Theatre on December 8, 1911.
- 1912
  - Lux School for Industrial Training for Girls opens.
  - Book Club of California established.
  - James Rolph becomes mayor.
  - Tadich Grill in business.
- 1914 – San Francisco National Guard Armory and Arsenal built.
- 1915
  - January 25: First transcontinental telephone call occurs (San Francisco-New York).
  - February 20: Panama–Pacific International Exposition opens; Tower of Jewels built.
  - San Francisco Labor Temple built.
  - San Francisco City Hall rebuilt.
  - Veterans Auditorium opens.
- 1916
  - Preparedness Day Bombing.
  - Legal Aid Society established.
  - Buena Vista Cafe in business.
- 1917 – Strand Theater built.
- 1922 – Golden Gate Theatre, and Castro Theatre built.
- 1923
  - January: Mae Nolan becomes U.S. representative for California's 5th congressional district.
  - August 2: US President Harding dies in the Palace Hotel.
- 1924
  - California Palace of the Legion of Honor opens.
  - April 24, opening of the Metropolitan Theatre in Cow Hollow
- 1925
  - Fleishhacker Pool built.
  - Florence Prag Kahn becomes U.S. representative for California's 4th congressional district.
- 1926 – Playland at the Beach in business.
- 1927 – San Francisco Municipal Airport dedicated.
- 1928 – Amazon Theater opens.
- 1929
  - Fleishhacker Zoo established.
  - Topsy's Roost (restaurant) in business.
- 1930 – Pacific Stock Exchange Lunch Club formed.
- 1931
  - Stern Grove opens as city park.
  - El Rey Theatre opens
- 1932
  - War Memorial Opera House opens.
  - Photographers' Group f/64 founded.
- 1933
  - San Francisco Opera Ballet founded.
  - Coit Tower built.
- 1934
  - May 9: General Strike begins.
  - U.S. Penitentiary established on Alcatraz Island.
  - Golden Grain Macaroni Company in business.
- 1935 – San Francisco Museum of Modern Art opens as San Francisco Museum of Art in Veterans Memorial Building.
- 1936 – Bay Bridge opens.
- 1937 – May 27: Golden Gate Bridge opens.
- 1940 – Holly Courts housing project built.
- 1944 – Church for the Fellowship of All Peoples established.
- 1945
  - Tonga Room in business.
  - April 25: United Nations Conference on International Organization begins.
  - June 26: United Nations Charter signed.
- 1946 – National Urban League branch and Marines' Memorial Club established.
- 1949 – Presidio Theatre built.

=== 1950s–1990s ===
- 1952 – The Purple Onion nightclub in business.
- 1953 – City Lights Bookstore in business.
- 1955 – City Lights Pocket Poets Series begins publication.
  - Allen Ginsberg reads his poem Howl for the first time at the Six Gallery
- 1957
  - San Francisco International Film Festival founded.
  - Caffe Trieste in business.
  - Sister city relationship established with Osaka, Japan.
  - The San Francisco Stock and Bond Exchange (formed in 1882) and the Los Angeles Oil Exchange (formed in 1899) merge to create the Pacific Coast Stock Exchange.
- 1959 – Embarcadero Freeway opens.
- 1960 – Mandarin restaurant in business.
- 1963– The Reverend Cecil Williams becomes pastor at Glide Memorial Church, shifting the church's politics to the left.
- 1964 – City's "San Francisco History Center" established.
- 1965 – Intersection for the Arts incorporated.
  - The musical group the Jefferson Airplane is created.
- 1966– The Compton's Cafeteria riot breaks out when transgender patrons become angry over police harassment.
- Church of Satan is formed
- 1967 – Summer of Love.
  - January: The Human Be-In takes place in Golden Gate park, a prelude to the Summer of Love.
  - The anarchist group The Diggers is founded, and begins distributing free food.
- 1968 – Sister city relationship established with Sydney, Australia.
  - The Church of John Coltrane is established, and continues religious services until 2016.
- 1969
  - 555 California Street built.
  - Sister city relationships established with Assisi, Italy; and Taipei, Taiwan.
  - The San Francisco Chronicle and Examiner receive their first letters from The Zodiac Killer.
- 1970 – Regional Metropolitan Transportation Commission established.
- 1971 – Peoples Temple in San Francisco and Church of the Tree of Life established.
- 1972
  - San Francisco Pride begins.
  - Golden Gate National Recreation Area established.
  - Transamerica Pyramid built.
- 1973
  - October: Zebra murders begin.
  - Church of the Gentle Brothers and Sisters incorporated.
  - Sister city relationship established with Haifa, Israel.
- 1974
  - People's Food System active (approximate date).
  - Southern Exposure (art space) and San Francisco Cable Car Museum established.
  - April 15: Hibernia Bank robbery by the Symbionese Liberation Army.
- 1975
  - Rainbow Grocery Cooperative opens.
  - Sister city relationship established with Seoul, South Korea.
  - September 22: Sara Jane Moore attempted to assassinate President Gerald Ford in front of the St. Francis Hotel by firing two gunshots at Ford; both shots missed.
- 1976 – Bay Area Video Coalition founded.
- 1977
  - Theatre Rhinoceros and Suicide Club founded.
  - Golden Dragon massacre
  - San Francisco Planning and Urban Research Association active.
- 1978
  - June 25: Rainbow flag (LGBT movement) introduced.
  - November 18: Jonestown mass murder-suicide at the People's Temple Guyana compound.
  - November 27: Moscone–Milk assassinations.
  - December 4: Dianne Feinstein becomes mayor.
- 1979
  - The Sisters of Perpetual Indulgence make their first appearance on Castro Street.
  - May 21: White Night riots.
  - Sister city relationship established with Shanghai, China.
- 1980 – Davies Symphony Hall opens.
- 1981
  - San Francisco Symphony Youth Orchestra and Hansberry Theatre established.
  - Sister city relationship established with Manila, Philippines.
- 1982 – City/county handgun ban approved; later struck down by state court.
- 1983
  - San Francisco General Hospital AIDS clinic established.
  - The first San Francisco Historic Trolley Festival takes place.
- 1984 – Sister city relationship established with Cork, Ireland.
- 1986
  - Cacophony Society formed.
  - A bonfire of a wooden man is held on Baker Beach which evolves into the Burning Man event.
  - Sister city relationship established with Abidjan, Côte d'Ivoire.
- 1987 – Luggage Store (arts organization) established.
- 1988 – San Francisco Museum and Historical Society founded.
- 1989
  - October 17: Loma Prieta earthquake.
  - San Francisco becomes a sanctuary city for illegal immigrants.
- 1990
  - Population: 723,959.
  - Sister city relationship established with Thessaloniki, Greece.
- 1991 – Museum of the City of San Francisco opens.
- 1992
  - Critical Mass (bicycle event) began.
  - Clarion Alley Mural Project organized.
  - Latino Coalition for a Healthy California headquartered in city.
- 1993
  - Yerba Buena Center for the Arts opens.
  - 101 California Street shooting occurs.
- 1994 – Santarchy begins.
- 1995
  - Craigslist founded.
  - Sister city relationship established with Ho Chi Minh City, Vietnam.
- 1996
  - City website online (approximate date).
  - Willie Brown becomes mayor.
  - Internet Archive headquartered in city.
  - Long Now Foundation established.
- 1997
  - Sister city relationship established with Paris, France.
  - Pinecrest Diner, a popular all-night diner-style restaurant in San Francisco, becomes notorious for a murder over an order of eggs.
- 1998 – Wattis Institute for Contemporary Arts founded.
- 2000 – Population: 776,733.

== 2000s ==
- 2001 - Fatal dog mauling of Diane Whipple.
- 2003
  - Bernal Heights Preservation established.
  - U.S. National Security Agency/AT&T Room 641A in operation.
  - Sister city relationship established with Zürich, Switzerland.
- 2004 – Gavin Newsom becomes mayor.
- 2005 – November: Gun control ordinance San Francisco Proposition H (2005) passes; later struck down.
- 2006 – the Metro Theatre in Cow Hollow closes
- 2007
  - Twitter Inc. in business.
  - Noisebridge founded.
- 2008
  - Edible Schoolyard established at San Francisco Boys and Girls Club.
  - One Rincon Hill (apartment building) constructed.
  - Airbnb in business.
- 2009
  - The Millennium Tower opens, later sinking and tilting.
  - Uber begins operating.
  - FailCon begins.
  - San Francisco Appeal begins publication.
  - Sister city relationships established with Bangalore, India; and Kraków, Poland.
- 2010
  - The Bay Citizen and Ocean Beach Bulletin begin publication.
  - Population: 805,235; metro 4,335,391.
  - Sister city relationships established with Amman, Jordan; and Barcelona, Spain.
- 2011
  - January 11: Ed Lee becomes mayor.
  - November 8: San Francisco mayoral election, 2011.
  - TechCrunch Disrupt conference begins.
- 2013
  - San Francisco tech bus protests begin.
  - Civic Industries in business.
- 2014 – San Francisco Giants baseball team win World Series contest.
- 2015 – Shooting of Kathryn Steinle occurs; a 32-year old woman is killed by a stray bullet fired by an illegal immigrant who was previously deported. The gunman found a gun laying around negligently, and claimed to have fired towards sea lions from a deck, thus hitting a bystander.
- 2020 – Orange Skies Day makes international headlines
- 2023 - Significantly high levels of crime, open-air drug use, homelessness, and closed storefronts have become more prominent features of Union Square.
- 2023 - March: Bob Lee was killed in a stabbing.
  - November: San Francisco hosts the 2023 Asia-Pacific Economic Cooperation (APEC) Leaders’ Summit.
- 2024 - July: Corazon Dandan is fatally shoved onto a Daly City-bound oncoming BART train, allegedly by a homeless mentally ill individual.
- 2024 - September: Shooting and wounding of Ricky Pearsall occurs in Union Square, over a robbery involving his Rolex watch allegedly done by a teenage male from Tracy, California.

== See also ==
- History of San Francisco
- National Register of Historic Places listings in San Francisco, California
- List of pre-statehood mayors of San Francisco
- List of mayors of San Francisco (since 1850)
- Timelines of San Francisco's sister cities: Abidjan, Amman, Barcelona, Haifa, Kraków, Manila, Osaka, Paris, Seoul, Shanghai, Sydney, Zürich
- Timeline of the San Francisco Bay Area
- Timelines of other cities in the Northern California area of California: Fresno, Mountain View, Oakland, Sacramento, San Jose

== Bibliography ==
=== Published in the 1800s ===
- Bogardus, John P. (1850). Bogardus' San Francisco, Sacramento city and Marysville business directory.
- Frank Soulé; John H. Gihon; James Nisbet (1855), Annals of San Francisco, New York: D. Appleton & Company, OL 13993482M
- San Francisco (article) (1870) The Overland Monthly, January 1870 Vol. 4, No. 1, pp. 9–23. San Francisco: A. Roman & Co., Publishers
- Adolph Wilhelm August Friedrich von Steinwehr (1874), "San Francisco", Centennial Gazetteer of the United States, Philadelphia: J.C. McCurdy & Company
- "San Francisco", Appleton's Illustrated Hand-Book of American Cities, New York: D. Appleton and Company, 1876
- B.E. Lloyd (1876), Lights and Shades in San Francisco, San Francisco: Printed by A.L. Bancroft, OCLC 25178673, OL 271116M
- John S. Hittell (1878), A History of the City of San Francisco, San Francisco: A. L. Bancroft & Co., OL 17997645M
- San Francisco Street Directory and Guide, San Francisco: W.C. Disturnell, 1882, OL 24280093M
- Disturnell's Stranger's Guide to San Francisco and Vicinity, San Francisco: W.C. Disturnell, 1883
- Frederick H. Hackett, ed. (1884), Industries of San Francisco, San Francisco: Payot, Upham & Co., OL 25400583M
- "San Francisco" . Encyclopædia Britannica. Vol. 21 (9th ed.). 1886.
- "San Francisco". Western and Southern States. Appletons' General Guide to the United States and Canada. New York: D. Appleton & Co. 1889.
- Joseph Sabin, ed. (1889). "San Francisco". Bibliotheca Americana. Vol. 18. New York. OCLC 13972268.
- Bay of San Francisco, the Metropolis of the Pacific Coast and Its Suburban Cities: a History, Lewis Publishing Company, 1892, OCLC 8666576
- Mary Roberts Smith (1895). "Almshouse Women: A Study of Two Hundred and Twenty-Eight Women in the City and County Almshouse of San Francisco". Publications of the American Statistical Association. 4 (31): 219–262. doi:10.2307/2967126. hdl:2027/njp.32101020296479. JSTOR 2967126.
- Faust's pocket map and guide with a complete street directory of San Francisco. H.W. Faust. 1898.

=== Published in the 1900s ===
1900s–1940s

- Robert C. Brooks (1901), "San Francisco", Bibliography of Municipal Problems and City Conditions, Municipal Affairs, vol. 5 (2nd ed.), New York: Reform Club, OCLC 1855351
- San Francisco-Oakland Directory. Oakland: Walter S. Fry Co. 1907.
- "San Francisco", United States (4th ed.), Leipzig: Karl Baedeker, 1909, OCLC 02338437
- "San Francisco" . Encyclopædia Britannica. Vol. 24 (11th ed.). 1910. pp. 144–148.
- Percy V. Long (1912). "Consolidated City and County Government of San Francisco". American Political Science Review. 8 (1): 109–121. JSTOR 3038399.
- Helen Throop Purdy (1912), San Francisco: As it Was, As It Is, and How to See It, P. Elder, OL 20459067M
- Edward Hungerford (1913), "San Francisco: the Newest Phoenix", The Personality of American Cities, New York: McBride, Nast & Company
- Frank Morton Todd (1914), Chamber of Commerce Handbook for San Francisco, San Francisco, OCLC 2650239, OL 23285599M
- Robert Ernest Cowan (1914), "San Francisco", Bibliography of the History of California and the Pacific West, 1510–1906, San Francisco: Book Club of California
- Andrew Cunningham McLaughlin and Albert Bushnell Hart, ed. (1914). "San Francisco". Cyclopedia of American Government. Vol. 3. D. Appleton and Company.
- Crocker-Langley San Francisco Directory. San Francisco: H.S. Crocker Co. 1917. hdl:2027/uc1.31158007441487.
- Samuel Williams (1921). City of the Golden Gate: A Description of San Francisco in 1875. San Francisco: Book Club of California.
- Vandegrift, Rolland A. (1922). "San Francisco" . Encyclopædia Britannica. Vol. 32 (12th ed.).
- Directorio comercial de San Francisco, California, 1924 (in Spanish), San Francisco, Calif.: Juan Anino, 1924
- Federal Writers' Project (1940), "Chronology of the San Francisco Bay Region", San Francisco: The Bay and Its Cities, American Guide Series, NY: Hastings House

1950s–1990s

- Around the world in San Francisco: a guide book to the racial and ethnic minorities of the San Francisco-Oakland district, San Francisco: Abbey Press, 1955, OL 22973852M
- Frank Mazzi (1973). "Harbingers of the City: Men and Their Monuments in Nineteenth Century San Francisco". Southern California Quarterly. 55 (2): 141–162. doi:10.2307/41170474. JSTOR 41170474.
- Robert Mayer (1974), Howard B. Furer (ed.), San Francisco: a Chronological & Documentary History, 1542–1970, American Cities Chronology Series, Dobbs Ferry, N.Y.: Oceana Publications, ISBN 0379006146
- Neil L. Shumsky (1976). "San Francisco's Workingmen Respond to the Modern City". California Historical Quarterly. 55 (1): 46–57. doi:10.2307/25157608. JSTOR 25157608.
- Maupin, Armistead (1978). Tales of the City. Harper Collins. ISBN 978-0-06-096404-7. OCLC 29847673.
- Ferlinghetti, Lawrence (1980). Literary San Francisco: A pictorial history from its beginnings to the present day. Harper & Row. ISBN 978-0-06-250325-1. OCLC 6683688.
- Ory Mazar Nergal, ed. (1980), "San Francisco", Encyclopedia of American Cities, New York: E.P. Dutton, OL 4120668M
- Margolin, Malcolm (1981). The Ohlone Way: Indian Life in the San Francisco-Monterey Bay Area. Heydey Books. ISBN 978-0-930588-01-4. OCLC 4628382.
- Joseph A. Blum (1984). "South San Francisco: The Making of an Industrial City". California History. 63 (2): 114–134. doi:10.2307/25158206. JSTOR 25158206.
- Asbury, Hubert (1989). The Barbary Coast: An Informal History of the San Francisco Underworld. Dorset Press. ISBN 978-0-88029-428-7. OCLC 22719465.
- Lotchin, Roger W. (1997). San Francisco, 1846–1856: From Hamlet to City. University of Illinois Press. ISBN 978-0-252-06631-3. OCLC 35650934.
- "San Francisco, California". Encyclopedia of Urban America. ABC-CLIO. 1998. ISBN 9780874368468 – via Credo Reference.(subscription required)

=== Published in the 2000s ===
- Hartman, Chester (2002). City for Sale: The Transformation of San Francisco. University of California Press. ISBN 978-0-520-08605-0. OCLC 48579085.
- San Francisco, Lonely Planet, 2002, OL 8647758M
- Chris Carlsson; Lisa Ruth Elliott, eds. (2010), Ten years that shook the city: San Francisco 1968–1978, San Francisco: City Lights Books, ISBN 978-1931404129
- Solnit, Rebecca. Infinite City: A San Francisco Atlas (University of California Press, 2010). 144 pp. ISBN 978-0-520-26250-8
- Richard Hu (2012), Urban Design In Downtown San Francisco: A Paradigm Shift? – via International Planning History Society
- Erica J. Peters (2013). San Francisco: A Food Biography. Rowman & Littlefield. ISBN 978-0759121539.
- Susan Crawford; et al. (2014), Community Fiber in Washington, D.C., Seattle, WA, and San Francisco, CA: Developments and Lessons Learned, Berkman Center Research Publication, SSRN 2439429 – via Social Science Research Network
- Michael Kimmelman (May 29, 2014), "Urban Renewal, No Bulldozer: San Francisco Repurposes Old for the Future", New York Times
