= Pinecrest Diner =

Coordinates: 37.787009°N 122.409998°W

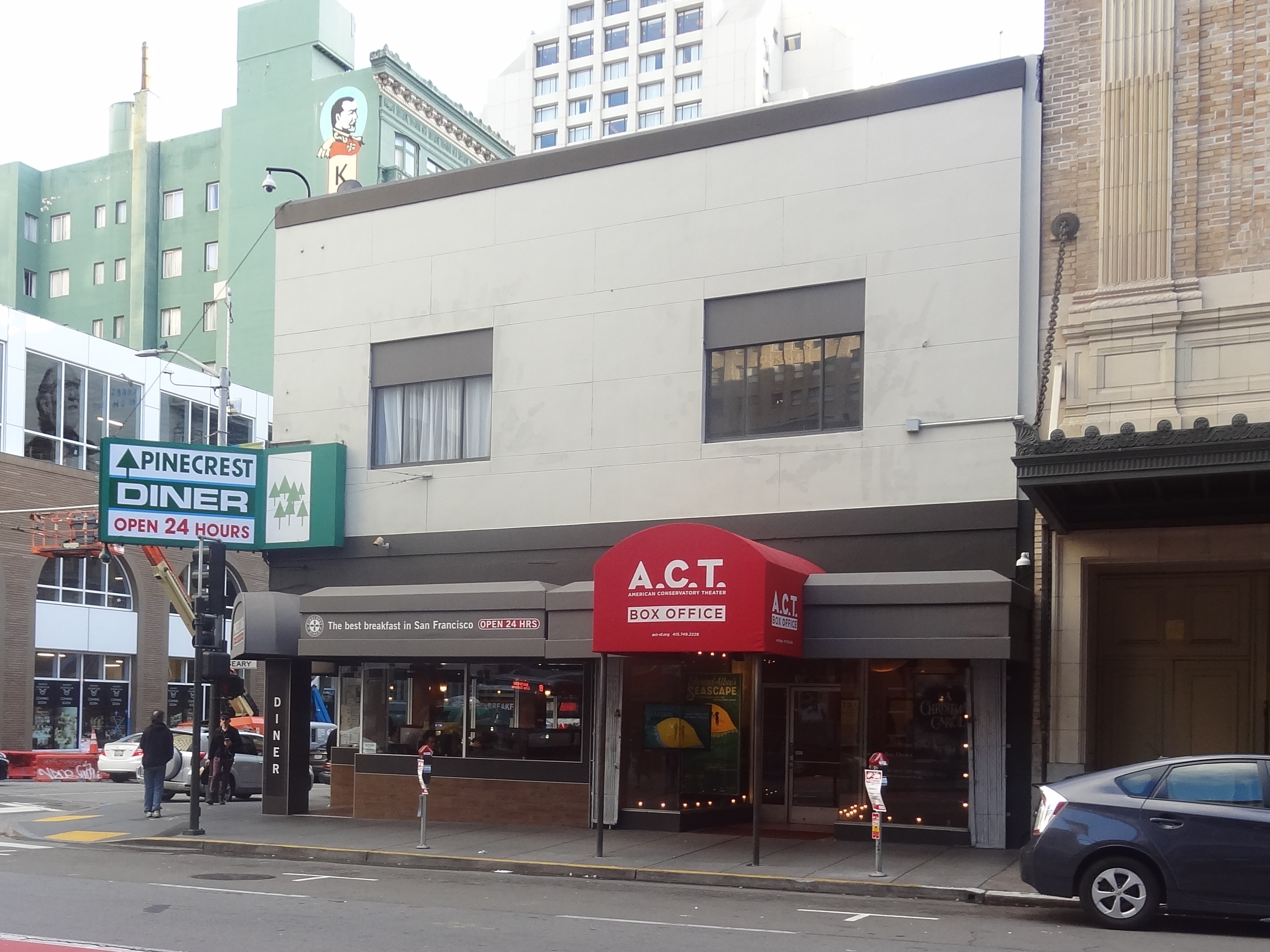
- Interactive map of Pinecrest Diner

Restaurant information
- Established: 1969
- Location: 401 Geary St, San Francisco, CA 94102, California, United States

The Pinecrest Diner is a popular all-night diner-style restaurant in San Francisco, California, notorious for a murder over an order of eggs.

== Infamy ==
A woman sat down at Pinecrest's counter and placed an order for poached eggs on July 24, 1997. Chef Hashem Zayed, a Jordanian immigrant, accepted the order even though the item was not on the menu. Waitress Helen Menicou, who had worked with Zayed for nearly twenty years, intervened, berating him in front of customers and other employees, and instructing him not to make the dish.

The next morning, after losing several thousand dollars in an all-night gambling binge, Zayed brought a .380 semiautomatic handgun to work. He announced he would shoot Menicou, then did so five times at point-blank range. She died in the hospital half an hour later.

The murder resonated among the many people Menicou knew from her many years at Pinecrest, as well as the public. Five hundred attended her funeral, and the California State Assembly adjourned in her honor on July 28. In the years since, the incident has become part of San Francisco folklore. No motive was ever determined for the crime other than the order of poached eggs. Nor was the identity of the customer ever discovered. Zayed himself died of a brain tumor just over three years later, on August 13, 2000.
