= Mental Health Association of San Francisco =

Charitable organisation

The Mental Health Association of San Francisco (MHA-SF) is a charitable organization which deals with mental health education, advocacy, research, and service in San Francisco. It was established as the San Francisco Mental Hygiene Society in 1947. The present name was adopted in 1957.

The San Francisco-based organization is one of 320 affiliates of Mental Health America (formerly known as the National Mental Health Association) throughout the United States and an affiliate of the Mental Health Association in California.

It has received core funding from The California Endowment.
