= Outline of California =

U.S. state

The flag of California

The seal of California

The location of the state of California in the United States

The following outline is provided as an overview of and topical guide to the U.S. state of California:

California is the most populous and the third most extensive of the 50 states of the United States of America. California is home to Los Angeles, San Francisco, San Diego, and Sacramento, respectively the 2nd, 6th, 17th, and 23rd most populous metropolitan areas of the United States.

California borders the North Pacific Ocean and Baja California in the Southwestern United States. California includes both Mount Whitney, the highest (4,421 m) mountain peak in the contiguous United States, and Death Valley, the lowest (−86 m) and hottest (56.7 °C) place in North America. California joined the Union as the 31st state on September 9, 1850.

== General reference ==
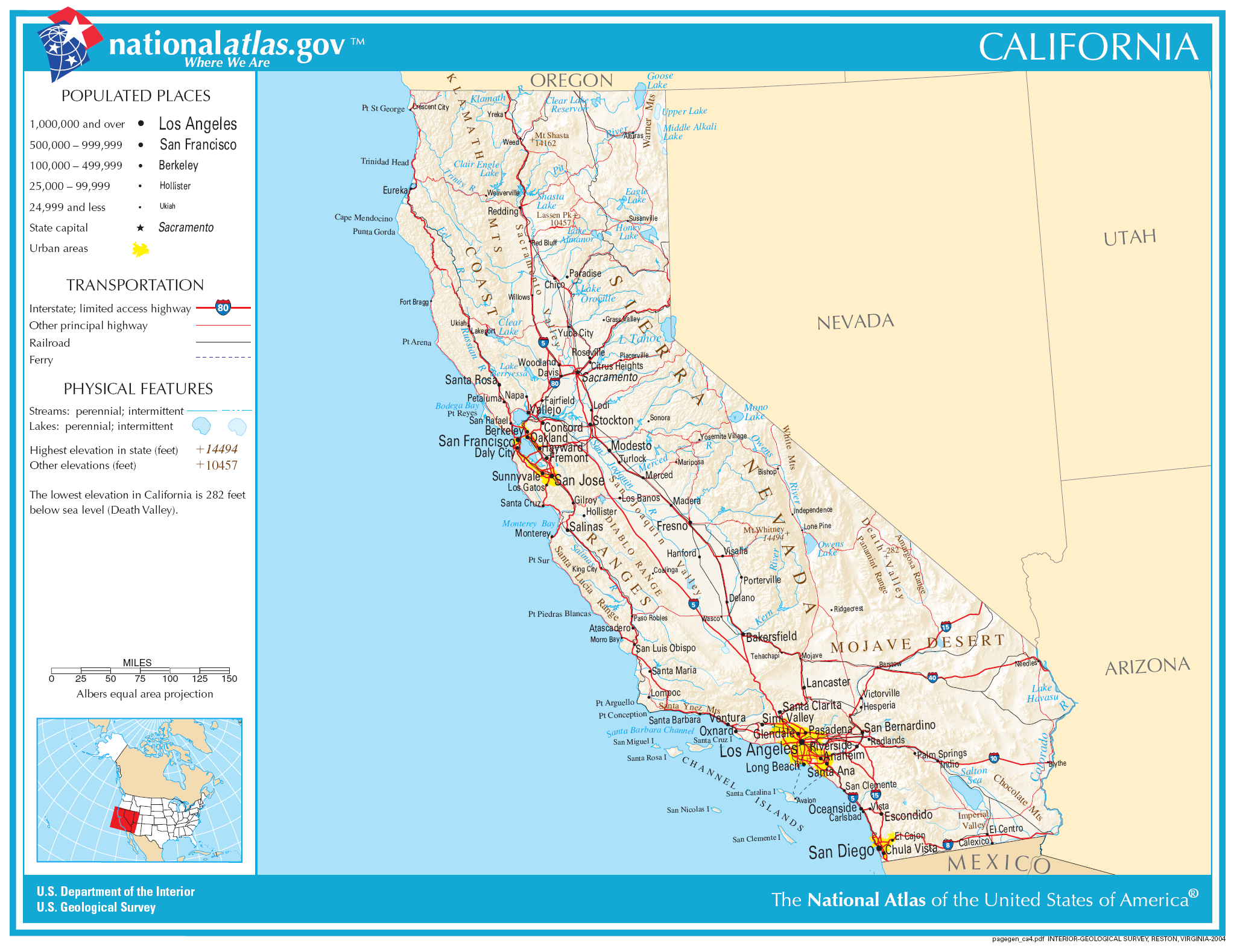
An enlargeable map of the state of California

- California state names
  - Common name: California
    - Pronunciation: US: /ˌkælɪfɔːrnjə, kælɪfɔːrniə/
    - Etymology: Etymology of California
  - Official name: State of California
  - Abbreviations and name codes
    - Postal symbol: CA
    - ISO 3166-2 code: US-CA
    - Internet second-level domain: .ca.us
    - Historic: Cal, Cali, or Calif
  - Nickname(s)
    - The Golden State (previously used on license plates)
    - The Bear Republic
  - Adjectival: California
  - Demonym: Californian, Californio
- California state symbols
  - Flag of California
  - Seal of California
  - List of California state symbols, including Motto and Song
    - See also: Category:Symbols of California

== Geography of California ==
Geography of California

- California is: a U.S. state, a federated state within the United States of America
- Location
  - Northern Hemisphere
  - Western Hemisphere
    - Americas
      - North America
        - Anglo America
        - Northern America
          - United States of America
            - Western United States
              - West Coast of the United States
              - Southwestern United States
- Population of California: 37,253,956 (2010 U.S. Census)
- Area of California: 163,700 sq mi (423,970 km^{2})
- Atlas of California

=== Places in California ===
Places in California

- Ghost towns in California
- List of California Historical Landmarks
  - National Historic Landmarks in California
  - National Register of Historic Places listings in California
    - Bridges on the National Register of Historic Places in California
  - Category: Historic districts in California
- National Natural Landmarks in California
- Category:National parks in California
- State parks in California
  - Category: Regional parks in California
    - Category: Municipal parks in California
- List of museums in California

=== Environment of California ===
Environment of California

- Climate of California
  - Climate change
- Natural history of California
- Protected areas in California
  - State forests of California
- Superfund sites in California
- Wildlife of California
  - Flora of California
    - California Floristic Province
    - California native plants
    - California chaparral and woodlands
  - Fauna of California
    - Birds of California
    - Mammals of California
    - Repopulation of wolves in California

==== Natural geographic features of California ====
- Arches of California (natural arches)
- Canyons and gorges of California
- Caves of California
- Coastal features of California
  - Bays of California
  - Beaches in California
  - Southern California Bight
  - Headlands of California
  - Peninsulas of California
  - Reefs of California
  - Straits of California
- Deserts of California
- Dunes of California
- Forests of California
- Grasslands of California
- Islands of California
- Bodies of water in California
  - Glaciers of California
  - Lakes of California
  - Oases of California
  - Rivers of California
  - Springs of California
  - Waterfalls in California
  - Watersheds of California
  - Wetlands of California
- Mesas of California
- Mountains of California
  - Hills of California
  - Mountain passes in California
  - Mountain ranges of California
  - Mountain peaks of California
  - Ridges of California
  - Volcanoes of California
- Rock formations of California
- Salt flats of California
- Valleys of California

=== Regions of California ===
- Northern California
  - Central California
    - Central Coast (North)
      - Big Sur
      - Monterey Bay Area
      - Salinas Valley
      - Santa Cruz Mountains
  - Central Valley (North)
    - Sacramento Valley
      - Chico Area
      - Greater Sacramento
      - Yuba–Sutter area
        - Sutter Buttes
    - Sacramento-San Joaquin River Delta
    - San Joaquin Valley (North)
      - Metropolitan Fresno
      - Merced Area
      - Modesto Area
      - Stockton Area
  - North Coast
    - Lost Coast
      - Emerald Triangle
    - Klamath Mountains
    - Mendocino Mountains
  - San Francisco Bay Area
    - East Bay
      - Oakland–Alameda County
      - Tri-Valley Area
        - Amador Valley
        - Livermore Valley
        - San Ramon Valley
    - North Bay
      - Marin County
      - Wine Country
        - Napa Valley
        - Russian River Valley
        - Sonoma Valley
      - Telecom Valley
    - The Peninsula
      - City and County of San Francisco
      - San Mateo County
    - South Bay
      - Santa Clara Valley
        - San Jose–Santa Clara County
        - Silicon Valley
  - Sierra Nevada
    - Gold Country
    - Lake Tahoe
    - Yosemite
  - Shasta Cascade
    - Mount Shasta
    - Redding Area
    - Trinity Alps
  - Tricorner Region/Surprise Valley
    - Modoc Plateau
    - Warner Mountains
- Southern California
  - Central Coast (South) /Tri-Counties
    - San Luis Obispo Area
      - Five Cities
    - Santa Barbara Area
    - Ventura Area
      - Oxnard Plain
  - Central Valley (South)
    - San Joaquin Valley (South)
      - Bakersfield Area
      - Visalia Area
  - Channel Islands
  - South Coast
    - Greater Los Angeles
      - Los Angeles Basin
          - Gateway Cities
          - Los Angeles City
            - East Los Angeles
            - Harbor Area
            - South Los Angeles
            - Westside
          - Palos Verdes Peninsula
        - South Bay
          - Beach Cities
        - Conejo Valley
        - San Gabriel Valley
      - Crescenta Valley
        - Peninsular Ranges (North)
          - San Jacinto Mountains
          - Santa Rosa Mountains
        - Pomona Valley
      - Puente Hills
      - Santa Clarita Valley
      - San Gabriel Mountains
      - San Fernando Valley
      - Santa Monica Mountains
        - Hollywood Hills
      - Orange County Area
        - Santa Ana-Anaheim-Irvine, CA
          - Santa Ana
        - South Coast Metro
      - Santa Ana Valley
      - Saddleback Valley
      - Santa Ana Mountains
    - San Diego–Tijuana
      - San Diego metropolitan area
        - North County
          - North County Coastal
          - North County Inland
        - East County
        - South Bay
        - Mountain Empire
  - Desert Region
    - Eureka Valley
    - Ivanpah Valley
      - Antelope Valley
      - Rainbow Basin
      - Saline Valley
    - Inland Empire (Riverside & San Bernardino Counties)
      - Death Valley
      - Mojave Desert (High Desert)
        - Victor Valley
        - Morongo Basin
      - Coachella Valley (Palm Springs, Indio, and Mecca area)
        - Eastern Coachella Valley (Mecca and vicinity)
      - West Valley Region
        - Cucamonga Valley
        - Chino Valley
      - Big Cities Region
        - Riverside Area
        - San Bernardino Area
        - San Bernardino Valley
        - San Jacinto Valley
      - Mountain Areas
        - San Bernardino Mountains
        - Little San Bernardino Mountains
    - Imperial Valley
      - El Centro metropolitan area
      - Sonoran Desert (Low Desert)
        - Colorado Desert
          - Salton Sink/Salton Sea
    - Owens Valley

=== Administrative divisions of California ===
An enlargeable map of the 58 counties of the state of California

==== Counties of California ====
The 58 Counties of the state of California

1. Alameda County, California
2. Alpine County, California
3. Amador County, California
4. Butte County, California
5. Calaveras County, California
6. Colusa County, California
7. Contra Costa County, California
8. Del Norte County, California
9. El Dorado County, California
10. Fresno County, California
11. Glenn County, California
12. Humboldt County, California
13. Imperial County, California
14. Inyo County, California
15. Kern County, California
16. Kings County, California
17. Lake County, California
18. Lassen County, California
19. Los Angeles County, California
20. Madera County, California
21. Marin County, California
22. Mariposa County, California
23. Mendocino County, California
24. Merced County, California
25. Modoc County, California
26. Mono County, California
27. Monterey County, California
28. Napa County, California
29. Nevada County, California
30. Orange County, California
31. Placer County, California
32. Plumas County, California
33. Riverside County, California
34. Sacramento County, California
35. San Benito County, California
36. San Bernardino County, California
37. San Diego County, California
38. San Francisco
39. San Joaquin County, California
40. San Luis Obispo County, California
41. San Mateo County, California
42. Santa Barbara County, California
43. Santa Clara County, California
44. Santa Cruz County, California
45. Shasta County, California
46. Sierra County, California
47. Siskiyou County, California
48. Solano County, California
49. Sonoma County, California
50. Stanislaus County, California
51. Sutter County, California
52. Tehama County, California
53. Trinity County, California
54. Tulare County, California
55. Tuolumne County, California
56. Ventura County, California
57. Yolo County, California
58. Yuba County, California

==== Municipalities in California ====
Municipalities in California

- Cities in California
  - State capital of California: Sacramento
  - Largest city in California: Los Angeles (also called "L.A." and "The City of Angels"; second largest city in the United States).
  - City nicknames in California
  - Sister cities in California
- Towns in California
- Category: Unincorporated communities in California
- Category: Census-designated places in California

==== Special Districts of California ====
- Category:Special districts of California

=== Demography of California ===
- Demographics of California

== Geology of California ==
=== Geology of California (general reference) ===
- Federal Authority: United States Geological Survey
- State Authority: California Geological Survey
- Museums: Geology museums in California
- Timeline: Geologic timeline of Western North America
- All related articles: Geology of California

=== Local Geologies of California ===
- Geology of California by County
- Geology of the Death Valley area
- Geology of the Lassen volcanic area
- Geology of Point Lobos area
- Geology of the Yosemite area

=== Economic Geology of California ===
- Mining in California
- Petroleum in California

=== Geodynamics of California ===
- Tectonic plates
  - Gorda Plate
  - North American Plate
  - Pacific Plate
- Contributing geodynamic features
  - Cascadia subduction zone
  - Gorda Ridge
  - East Pacific Rise
- Seismic faults of California
  - List of earthquakes in California

=== Stratigraphy of California ===
- Stratigraphy of California
  - Geologic formations of California
  - Geologic groups of California
- Fossiliferous stratigraphic units in California
- Rock formations of California

=== Physiographic regions of California ===
California is part of the North American continent on the American Landmass. Specific physiographic Divisions, Provinces, and Sections of California can be divided as follows;

- Pacific Coast Ranges division (pacific mountain system)
  - Pacific Border province
    - Klamath Mountains
    - California Trough (Central Valley)
    - Coast Ranges
    - Transverse Ranges
      - Northern Channel Islands
  - Cascade-Sierra province
    - Southern Cascade Mountains
    - Sierra Nevada
  - Baja California peninsula
    - Los Angeles Basin
    - Peninsular Ranges (Los Angeles Range)
      - Southern Channel Islands
- Intermontane Plateaus division
  - Basin and Range province
    - Modoc Plateau
    - Great Basin
    - Mojave Desert
    - Salton Trough (Colorado Desert)

== Government and politics of California ==
Politics of California

- Form of government: U.S. state government
- California's congressional delegations
- California State Capitol
- Elections in California
  - Electoral reform in California
- Political party strength in California

=== Branches of the government of California ===
Government of California

==== Executive branch of the government of California ====
- Governor of California
  - Lieutenant Governor of California
  - Secretary of State of California
  - State Treasurer of California
- State departments
  - California Department of Transportation

==== Legislative branch of the government of California ====
- California State Legislature (bicameral)
  - Upper house: California State Senate
  - Lower house: California State Assembly

==== Judicial branch of the government of California ====
Courts of California

- Supreme Court of California

=== Law and order in California ===
Law of California

- Adoption in California
- Cannabis in California
- Capital punishment in California
  - Individuals executed in California
- California Constitution
- Crime in California
  - Organized crime in California
- Gambling in California
- Gun laws in California
- Law enforcement in California
  - Law enforcement agencies in California
    - California State Police
- Same-sex marriage in California

=== Military in California ===
- California Air National Guard
- California Army National Guard

=== Local government in California ===
Local government in California

== History of California ==
=== History of California, by period ===
The location of the state of California in the United States of America

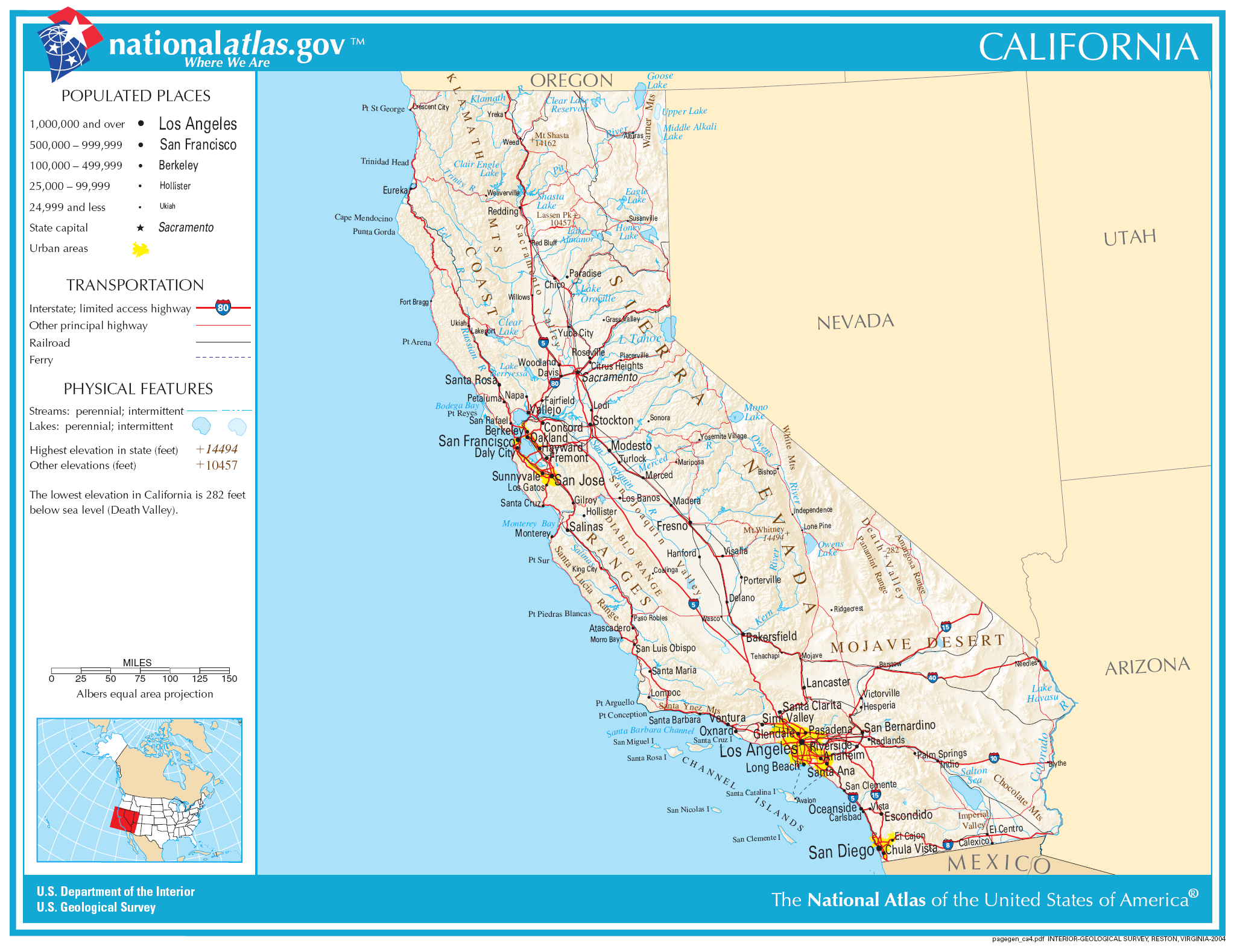
An enlargeable map of the state of California

An enlargeable map of the 58 counties of the state of California

- Bibliography of California history
- Prehistory of California
  - Indigenous peoples
    - Arlington Springs Man
  - Population of Native California
  - Traditional narratives (Native California)
- History of California through 1899
  - List of pre-statehood governors of California
  - El Presidio Reál de San Diego established May 14, 1769
  - Spanish colony of Provincia de Las Californias, June 3, 1770, to March 26, 1804
    - El Presidio Reál de San Carlos de Monterey established June 3, 1770
    - El Presidio Reál de San Francisco de Asis established September 17, 1776
    - El Presidio Reál de Santa Barbara established April 21, 1782
    - Spanish missions in California
    - Ranchos of California
    - History of slavery in California
    - Mission Indians
      - California mission clash of cultures
  - Spanish colony of Alta California, March 26, 1804, to August 24, 1821
    - Adams–Onís Treaty of 1819
  - Mexican War of Independence, September 16, 1810, to August 24, 1821
    - Treaty of Córdoba, August 24, 1821
  - Mexican territory of Alta California, August 24, 1821, to December 15, 1835
    - Constitution of Mexico of 1824
  - Centralist Mexican department of Las Californias, December 15, 1835, to February 2, 1848
    - California Trail, 1841–1869
  - Mexican–American War, April 25, 1846, to February 2, 1848
    - Conquest of California
      - California Republic, 1846
      - California Battalion
  - U.S. Military Province of California, 1846–1849
    - California Gold Rush, 1848–1855
    - Treaty of Guadalupe Hidalgo, February 2, 1848
  - U.S. Provisional Government of California, 1849–1850
    - State of Deseret (extralegal), 1849–1850
    - Compromise of 1850
    - An Act for the Admission of the State of California
  - State of California becomes 31st state admitted to the United States of America on September 9, 1850
    - Rail transport in California since 1856
    - Pony Express, 1860–1861
    - American Civil War, April 12, 1861 – May 13, 1865
      - California in the American Civil War
    - First Transcontinental Telegraph completed 1861
    - Anti-Coolie Act of 1862
    - First transcontinental railroad completed 1869
    - Sequoia National Park established on September 25, 1890
    - Yosemite National Park established on October 1, 1890
    - General Grant National Park established on October 1, 1890
    - Sierra Club founded May 28, 1892, in San Francisco
    - Spanish–American War, April 25 – August 12, 1898
  - History of California 1900 to present
    - 1906 San Francisco earthquake, April 18, 1906
    - Lassen Volcanic National Park established on August 9, 1916
    - Herbert Hoover becomes 31st President of the United States on March 4, 1929
    - California Agricultural Strike 1933
    - World War II, September 1, 1939 – September 2, 1945
      - United States enters Second World War on December 8, 1941
      - Japanese American internment, 1942–1945
    - Kings Canyon National Park established on March 4, 1940
    - Summer of Love, 1967
    - Senator Robert F. Kennedy assassinated in Los Angeles on June 6, 1968
    - Redwoods National Park established on October 2, 1968
    - Richard Nixon becomes 37th President of the United States on January 20, 1969
    - The 1969 Santa Barbara oil spill occurs in January and February of that year
    - Channel Islands National Park established on March 5, 1980
    - Former governor Ronald Reagan becomes 40th President of the United States on January 20, 1981
    - 1989 Loma Prieta earthquake, October 17, 1989
    - 1994 Northridge earthquake, January 17, 1994
    - Death Valley National Park designated on October 31, 1994
    - Joshua Tree National Park designated on October 31, 1994
    - 2000–01 California electricity crisis

=== History of California, by region ===
- Counties
  - History of Orange County, California
  - History of Santa Clara County, California
- Cities
  - History of Chico, California
  - History of Los Angeles, California
    - History of the San Fernando Valley to 1915
    - History of Pasadena, California
  - History of Piedmont, California
  - History of Riverside, California
  - History of Sacramento, California
  - History of San Bernardino, California
  - History of San Diego, California
  - History of San Francisco, California
  - History of San Jose, California
  - History of Santa Monica, California

=== History of California, by subject ===
- Food
  - History of California bread
  - History of California wine
- List of California state legislatures
- Maritime history of California
- Marriage: History of marriage in California
- Natural history of California
- Slavery: History of slavery in California
- Territorial evolution of California
- Transportation
  - History of California's state highway system
  - History of rail transport in California
- Universities of California
  - History of the University of California, Berkeley
  - History of the University of California, Los Angeles
  - History of the University of California, Riverside

== Culture of California ==
- Cuisine of California
- Museums in California

=== The arts in California ===
- Art in California
- Music of California
- Theater in California

=== Clubs and Societies in California ===
Category:Clubs and societies in California

- Category:Clubhouses in California
- Category:Gentlemen's clubs in California
- Category:Historical societies in California
- Scouting in California

=== People of California ===
People from California

- By location
  - People from Bakersfield, California
  - People from Berkeley, California
  - People from Big Bear Lake, California
  - People from Bolinas, California
  - People from Chula Vista, California
  - People from Compton, California
  - People from Eureka, California
  - People from Fresno, California
  - People from Fullerton, California
  - People from Hayward, California
  - People from Long Beach, California
  - People from Los Angeles
    - People from Los Feliz, Los Angeles
  - People from Malibu, California
  - People from Manhattan Beach, California
  - People from Marin County, California
  - People from Newport Beach, California
  - People from Oakland, California
  - People from Orange County, California
    - People from Anaheim, California
    - People from Laguna Beach, California
    - People from Irvine, California
    - People from Santa Ana, California (county seat)
  - People from Pacific Palisades, Los Angeles
  - People from Palm Springs, California
  - People from Pasadena, California
  - People from Rancho Cucamonga, California
  - People from Riverside, California
  - People from Sacramento, California
  - People from San Bernardino, California
  - People from San Diego
    - People from La Jolla
  - People from San Francisco
  - People from San Jose, California
  - People from Santa Barbara, California
  - People from Santa Cruz, California
  - People from Santa Monica, California
  - People from Santa Rosa, California
  - People from Stockton, California
  - People from Visalia, California
  - People from Whittier, California
- By government position
  - California district attorneys
  - United States senators from California
  - City managers of San Jose, California
  - Justices of the Supreme Court of California
- By ethnicity
  - Indigenous peoples of California
  - Hispanics and Latinos in California
    - Californios
  - Asian Americans in California
  - African Americans in California
  - White Americans in California
- By occupation
  - Music directors of the Ojai Music Festival
  - Musicians from the Inland Empire
  - Los Angeles Pobladores
  - Palm Springs Walk of Stars
- By organization
  - Society of California Pioneers
- By school
  - California Institute of Technology people
  - California State University, Fullerton people
  - California State University, San Bernardino people
- By other aspect
  - People associated with the California Gold Rush

=== Religion in California ===
Category:Religion in California

- Category:Buddhism in California
- Category:Christianity in California
  - The Church of Jesus Christ of Latter-day Saints in California
  - Episcopal Diocese of California
- Category:Hinduism in California
- Category:Islam in California
- Category:Jews and Judaism in California
- Category:Unitarian Universalism in California

=== Sports in California ===
Sports in California

- Professional sports teams in California

== Economy and infrastructure of California ==
Economy of California

- California companies
- Economic regions of California
- Category:Economy of California by county

Sectors and Industries

- Agriculture in California
- Cemeteries in California
- Communications in California
  - Newspapers in California
  - Radio stations in California
  - Television stations in California
- Energy in California
  - Power stations in California
  - Renewable energy in California
    - Solar power in California
    - Wind power in California
- Health care in California
  - Hospitals in California
- Transportation of California
  - Airports in California
  - Rail transport in California
  - Roads in California
    - U.S. Highways in California
    - Interstate Highways in California
    - State highways in California
- Water in California

== Education in California ==
Education in California

- Schools in California
  - School districts in California
    - High schools in California
  - Colleges and universities in California
    - University of California
    - California State University
    - Stanford University

== See also ==
- Index of California-related articles
- Bibliography of California history
- Template:California
- Category:Outlines of U.S. states
- California templates
  - Category:California navigational boxes
