= Bivens =

Bivens is a surname. Notable people with the surname include:

- Beverly Bivens (born 1946), American singer
- Bill Bivens (1915-1984), American radio announcer
- Carolyn Bivens (born 1952), American golf commissioner
- Don Bivens (born 1952), American attorney
- Kylie Bivens (born 1978), American soccer player
- Malcolm Bivens (born 1990), American wrestler and wrestling manager
- Richard Bivens (born 1979), American musician
- Spencer Bivens (born 1994), American baseball player

== See also ==
- Bivens v. Six Unknown Named Agents
