= South of Dixie =

1944 film

- Theatrical release poster
- Directed by: Jean Yarbrough
- Screenplay by: Clyde Bruckman
- Story by: Sam Coslow
- Produced by: Jean Yarbrough
- Starring: Anne Gwynne; David Bruce; Jerome Cowan; Ella Mae Morse; Joe Sawyer; Samuel S. Hinds
- Cinematography: Jerome Ash
- Edited by: Paul Landres
- Production company: Universal Pictures
- Distributed by: Universal Pictures
- Release date: June 23, 1944
- Running time: 61 minutes
- Country: United States
- Language: English

South of Dixie is a 1944 American comedy film directed by Jean Yarbrough and written by Clyde Bruckman. The film stars Anne Gwynne, David Bruce, Jerome Cowan, Ella Mae Morse, Joe Sawyer and Samuel S. Hinds. The film was released om June 23, 1944, by Universal Pictures.

== Cast ==
- Anne Gwynne as Dixie Holister
- David Bruce as Danny Lee
- Jerome Cowan as Bill 'Brains' Watson
- Ella Mae Morse as Barbara Ann Morgan
- Joe Sawyer as Ernest Hatcher
- Samuel S. Hinds as Col. Andrew J. Morgan
- Eddie Acuff as Jay Hatcher
- Marie Harmon as Annabella Hatcher
- Oscar O'Shea as Col. Hatcher
- Louise Beavers as Magnolia Brown / Chloe
- Pierre Watkin as Dean Williamson
- Bill Bivens as Announcer
- Marie Blake as Ruby
- Rita Gould as Shoe Customer
- Edward Keane as Mr. Platt
- Mantan Moreland as The Porter
- Ray Walker as Newspaper Reporter
- Eddie Bruce as Shoe Salesman
- Jack Mulhall as Newspaper Photographer
- Bobby Brooks as himself
- Lester Cole as himself
