= Timeline of Oakland, California =

The following is a timeline of the history of the city of Oakland, Alameda County, California, United States.

== 19th century ==
- 1852 – Town of Oakland incorporated.
- 1854 – Horace Carpentier elected mayor.
- 1855 – Lyceum founded.
- 1860 – Population: 1,543.
- 1863 – Heald's Business College established.
- 1864 – Vander Naillen School of Practical Engineering established.
- 1866 – Police Court established.
- 1868
  - Oakland Evening Transcript newspaper begins publication.
  - University of California and Oakland Library Association established.
  - Oakland Long Wharf bought by Central Pacific Railroad.
- 1869
  - Railway begins operating.
  - Lake Merritt Wild-Fowl Sanctuary and Oakland Fire Department established.
  - Oakland Long Wharf becomes the western terminus of the First transcontinental railroad.
- 1871 – Mills Seminary relocates to Oakland.
- 1872
  - Brooklyn becomes part of Oakland.
  - Theosophical Society Library founded.
- 1873 – University of California relocates to Berkeley.
- 1875 – Oakland Daily Evening Tribune newspaper in publication.
- 1878 – Oakland Free Library opens.
- 1880 – Population: 34,456.
- 1884 – Horton School established.
- 1899 – Oakland Conservatory of Music established.
- 1900 – Population: 66,960.

== 20th century ==
- 1904 – Pacific Technical College established.
- 1906
  - April 18: San Francisco earthquake; refugees flee to Oakland.
  - August 6: Newman's College, one of the first sportsbars, was registered as a corporation in Oakland.
- 1907 – California School of Arts and Crafts founded.
- 1909
  - Samuel Merritt College founded.
  - Moore & Scott Iron Works in business.
- 1910
  - Oakland Public Museum and YMCA open.
  - Population: 150,174.
- 1912 – Oakland School Women's Club and Children's Hospital founded.
- 1913 – Oakland Yacht Club established.
- 1914
  - Oakland Technical High School established.
  - Oakland City Hall and Civic Auditorium built.
- 1917 – Joaquin Miller Park established.
- 1920 – Population: 216,261.
- 1922 – Snow Museum of Natural History opens.
- 1923 – Tribune Tower completed.
- 1924 – Granada Theater opens.
- 1927
  - Oakland Airport begins operating.
  - Port of Oakland opens.
- 1928
  - Clorox Chemical Company in business.
  - Posey Tube (traffic tunnel) built.
- 1931 – Paramount Theatre built.
- 1933 – Oakland Symphony active.
- 1936
  - San Francisco–Oakland Bay Bridge opens.
  - Alameda County Courthouse built.
  - Alameda County Botanical and Zoological Society established.
- 1937 – Caldecott Tunnel opens.
- 1940 – Population: 302,163.
- 1944 – Oakland Army Base active.
- 1946 – 1946 Oakland General Strike begins on December 3 and ends on December 5.
- 1954 – Oakland Junior College established.
- 1961 – Coliseum Drive-In opens.
- 1966
  - October: Black Panther Party established.
  - Oakland Coliseum opens.
- 1968 – Athletics baseball team relocates to Oakland.
- 1969 – Oakland Museum opens.
- 1970 – Regional Metropolitan Transportation Commission established.
- 1971 – Your Black Muslim Bakery in business.
- 1972 – 12th Street Oakland City Center station, 19th Street Oakland station, and MacArthur station open.
- 1973 – Rockridge station opens.
- 1974 – West Oakland station opens.
- 1977 – Lionel Wilson becomes mayor.
- 1985 – Alameda County Community Food Bank established.
- 1988 – Oakland East Bay Symphony established.
- 1989 – October 17: 1989 Loma Prieta earthquake.
- 1990 – Population: 372,242.
- 1991 – October 20: Oakland firestorm of 1991.
- 1998 – City website online (approximate date).
- 1999 – Jerry Brown becomes mayor.
- 2000 – Allen v. City of Oakland lawsuit filed.

== 21st century ==
- 2002 – Taoist Center opens.
- 2003
  - April 7: Anti-war protest.
  - Women of Color Resource Center headquartered in Oakland.
  - Urban Habitat headquartered in Oakland (approximate date).
- 2004 – Middle Harbor Shoreline Park landscaped.
- 2007
  - East Bay Meditation Center opens.
  - Ron Dellums becomes mayor.
- 2008 – Cathedral of Christ the Light dedicated.
- 2009
  - January 1: BART Police shooting of Oscar Grant.
  - March 21: 2009 shootings of Oakland police officers.
  - Oakland Local begins publication.
- 2010
  - Ace Monster Toys founded.
  - Population: city 390,724; metro 4,335,391.
- 2011
  - October 10: Occupy Oakland begins.
  - Jean Quan becomes mayor.
  - Sudoroom established.
- 2012
  - April 2: 2012 Oikos University shooting.
  - Oakland Wiki begins publication.
- 2014
  - Oakland Police Beat begins publication.
  - Libby Schaaf becomes mayor.
- 2016 - 2016 Oakland warehouse fire.
- 2020
  - George Floyd protests in the San Francisco Bay Area.
  - COVID-19 pandemic in the San Francisco Bay Area.
- 2022 - Sheng Thao becomes mayor.
- 2024 - Thao is recalled in an election.
- 2025 - Barbara Lee becomes mayor.

== See also ==
- History of Oakland
- List of mayors of Oakland, California
- Timeline of the San Francisco Bay Area
- Timelines of other cities in the Northern California area of California: Fresno, Mountain View, Sacramento, San Francisco, San Jose

== Bibliography ==
=== Published in the 19th century ===
- "Oakland", Disturnell's Stranger's Guide to San Francisco and Vicinity, San Francisco: W.C. Disturnell, 1883
- Husted's Oakland, Alameda and Berkeley Directory, San Francisco, Cal.: F.M. Husted
  - 1890 ed.
  - 1892 ed.
- "City of Oakland", Bay of San Francisco, the Metropolis of the Pacific Coast and Its Suburban Cities: a History, Lewis Publishing Company, 1892, OCLC 8666576
- Jos. Alex Colquhoun, ed. (1893), "City of Oakland", Illustrated Album of Alameda County, California, Oakland, Calif: Pacific Press

=== Published in the 20th century ===
- Husted's Oakland, Alameda and Berkeley Directory, San Francisco, Cal.: F.M. Husted
  - 1905 ed.
  - 1909 ed.
  - 1911 ed.
  - 1915 ed.
  - 1924 ed.
- San Francisco-Oakland Directory. Oakland: Walter S. Fry Co. 1907.
- Joseph Eugene Baker (1914), "Oakland", Past and Present of Alameda County, California, Chicago, Ill.: S.J. Clarke
- Polk's Oakland, Berkeley, Alameda City Directory, San Francisco, Cal.: R.L. Polk & Company, 1928
- Oakland, Alameda, Berkeley and San Leandro street address telephone directory, Pacific Telephone and Telegraph Co
  - 1938 ed.
  - 1944 ed.
- Federal Writers' Project (1940), "Oakland", San Francisco: The Bay and Its Cities, American Guide Series, NY: Hastings House
