= List of people from Santa Ana, California =

This is a list of notable past and present residents of the U.S. city of Santa Ana, California, and its surrounding metropolitan area.

== Athletics ==
- Stephen Abas (born January 12, 1978) – three-time NCAA champion wrestler and Olympic silver medalist at 2004 Summer Olympics in freestyle wrestling
- Ben Agajanian (August 28, 1919 – Feb 8, 2018) – collegiate and professional football player
- David Aldana (born November 26, 1949) – motorcycle racer
- Frankie Amaya (born September 26, 2000) – soccer midfielder
- Bob Ammann (born May 27, 1965) – soccer goalkeeper
- Daniel Antúnez (born February 10, 1986) – soccer midfielder
- Victor Auer (March 24, 1937 – May 3, 2011) – sports shooter and Olympic medalist for the United States
- Bill Bean (born May 11, 1964) – Major League Baseball player
- Richard Bivens (born August 26, 1979) – Musician
- Eddie Bockman (July 26, 1920 – September 29, 2011) – professional baseball player and scout
- Cedric Bozeman (born March 7, 1983) – basketball player
- Timothy J. Clark (born June 30, 1951) – Artist
- Isaac Curtis (born October 20, 1950) – professional football wide receiver
- Don Davis (December 16, 1943 – March 8, 2018) – professional football defensive tackle
- Fumio Demura (September 15, 1938 – April 24, 2023) – master of karate and kobudo (weaponry)
- Cynthia Denzler (born May 12, 1983) – alpine skier
- Sandro Dias (born April 18, 1975) – professional vert skateboarder
- Lenny Dykstra (born February 10, 1963) – MLB center fielder
- Don Edmunds (September 23, 1930 – August 11, 2020) – race car driver and car builder
- Clancy Edwards (born August 9, 1955) – track and field sprinter
- Danny Espinosa (born April 25, 1987) – second baseman for Washington Nationals, Los Angeles Angels
- Hebron Fangupo (born July 19, 1985) – football nose tackle
- Ben Francisco (born October 23, 1981) – professional baseball outfielder
- David Gibson (born November 5, 1977) – NFL safety
- Khaled Holmes (born January 19, 1990) – USC and NFL center
- Rosie Jones (born November 13, 1959) – professional golfer
- Jeff Kemp (born July 11, 1959) – NFL football quarterback
- Matt Leinart (born May 11, 1983) – USC and NFL football quarterback
- Colin Long (born June 19, 1989) – professional ice hockey center and assistant coach
- Larry Lutz (1913–1998) – football player and coach
- Jeff MacPherson (born June 9, 1956) – driver
- Jamie Martin (born February 8, 1970) – quarterback of NFL and NFL Europe
- Gilbert Melendez (born April 12, 1982) – mixed martial artist
- Yaotzin Meza (born February 4, 1981) – mixed martial artist
- Donn Moomaw (born October 15, 1931) – football player and Presbyterian minister
- Kim Mulkey (born May 17, 1962) – women's head basketball coach at Louisiana State University
- Jack Musick (c. 1925 – November 27, 1977) – football player and coach
- Billy Preston (born October 26, 1997) – basketball player
- Christian Ramirez (born April 4, 1991) – soccer player
- Erasmo Ramirez (born April 29, 1976) – MLB left-handed relief pitcher
- Ronny Rios (born January 22, 1990) – professional boxer
- Jeff Robinson (born December 13, 1960) – MLB right-handed pitcher
- Jesse Ruíz (born July 31, 1985) – wrestler
- Marlene Sandoval (born January 18, 1984) – football defender and member of Mexico women's national team
- Bryan Save (born December 16, 1981) – football defensive tackle
- Nick Scandone (March 4, 1966 – January 2, 2009) – yachtsman
- Paul Soliai (born December 30, 1983) – football defensive tackle
- Dave Stieb (born July 22, 1957) – MLB right-handed pitcher
- Kelly Talavou (born October 4, 1984) – football defensive tackle
- Stephen Tepper (born March 10, 1969) – ice hockey right wing
- Lenny Vandermade (born January 3, 1981) – football coach
- Mitch Williams (born November 17, 1964) – MLB relief pitcher and TV commentator

== Art and literature ==
- Kimberly Duran (1989) – "Shmi," Chicana muralist
- Carlee Fernández (1973) – sculptor and photographer

== Film, television and theatre ==
- Wade Boteler (October 3, 1888 – May 7, 1943) – actor
- Dale Fuller (June 17, 1885 – October 14, 1948) – actress of the silent era
- Brett Halsey (born June 20, 1933) – actor
- Michael B. Jordan (born February 9, 1987) – actor
- Diane Keaton (born January 5, 1946) – actress
- Louie Olivos Jr. – actor, producer, director, and playwright
- Michelle Pfeiffer (born April 29, 1958) – actress and singer
- John Raitt (January 29, 1917 – February 20, 2005) – actor and singer
- Robert Webber (October 14, 1924 – May 19, 1989) – actor

== Music ==
- Manuela Budrow (1876–1966) – vocalist, composer, music educator based in Santa Ana after 1923
- Roy Estrada (born April 17, 1943) – bassist, singer-songwriter, record producer, actor and convicted child molester, bassist with Frank Zappa, Mothers of Invention, Little Feat and Captain Beefheart
- Dinah Jane Hansen (born June 22, 1997) – singer, member of girl group Fifth Harmony
- Bill Medley (born September 19, 1940) – singer, one half of the Righteous Brothers
- Mr. Mixx (born September 23, 1963) – rapper
- Duke Montana (born February 7, 1975) – Italian-American rapper
- Lindsey Stirling (born September 21, 1986) – violinist, YouTuber, singer-songwriter
- Kathy Young (born October 21, 1945) – singer

== Politics ==
- Lou Correa (born January 24, 1958) – U.S. representative, former California state senator, state representative, and Orange County Supervisor; lives in Santa Ana
- Anna Paulina Luna (b. 1989) – U.S. representative for Florida
- Miguel A. Pulido (1956) – mayor of Santa Ana
- William H. Spurgeon (October 10, 1829 – June 20, 1915) – founder of Santa Ana

== See also ==
- List of people from California
