= 1976 Chowchilla kidnapping =

Mass child abduction in California, US

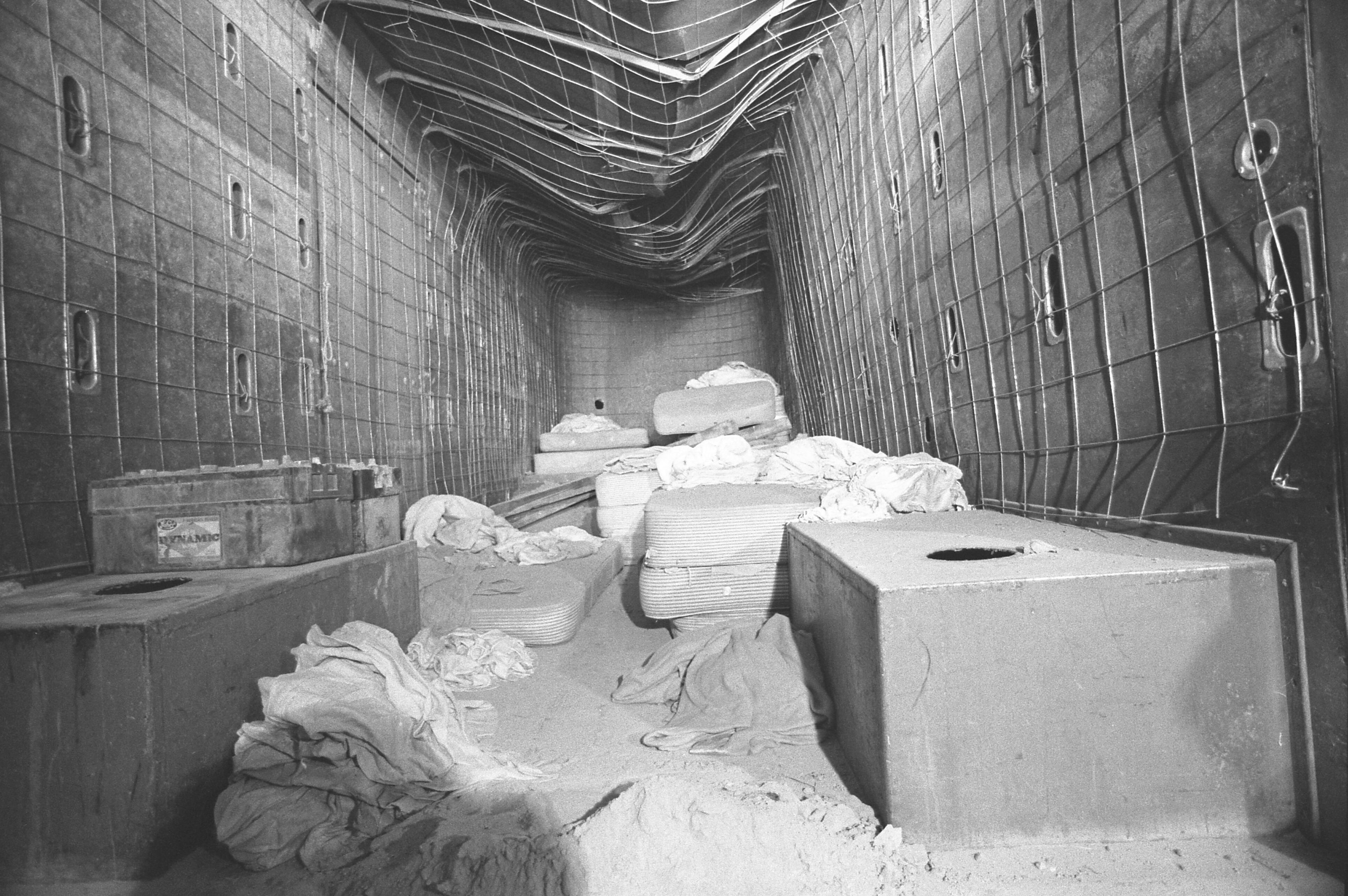
- Interior of the trailer where the victims were held
- Location: Chowchilla, California, U.S.
- Date: July 15, 1976 – July 16, 1976; 50 years ago
- Attack type: Mass kidnapping, mass child abduction, attempted robbery, psychological torture
- Weapon: Rifle
- Injuries: Several children suffering cuts, bruises, and burns
- Victims: 26 children and 1 adult
- Perpetrators: James Schoenfeld; Richard Schoenfeld; Frederick Newhall Woods IV
- Defenders: Frank Edward Ray; Michael Marshall
- Motive: Ransom
- Charges: Kidnapping for ransom and robbery, infliction of bodily harm
- Verdict: All pleaded guilty to kidnapping; All found guilty of infliction of bodily harm at trial; Infliction of bodily harm convictions overturned
- Convictions: Kidnapping for ransom Robbery
- Sentence: Life imprisonment with the possibility of parole (previously without parole): Richard was paroled after 36 years; James was paroled after 39 years; Woods was paroled after 46 years

On July 15, 1976, in Chowchilla, California, three armed men hijacked a school bus. They abducted the driver and 26 children, ages 5 to 14, and imprisoned them in a truck trailer buried in a quarry in Livermore, California. The bus driver and children managed to escape before the kidnappers could issue their ransom demands.

All of the victims survived, but many suffered from post-traumatic stress disorder. The kidnappers intended to use ransom money from the kidnapping to restore the Victorian Rengstorff House in Mountain View, California.

The kidnappers were caught, convicted, and sentenced to life without the possibility of parole. An appellate court overturned the finding of bodily harm, and the kidnappers were subsequently resentenced to life with the possibility of parole. The incident led to major changes in California laws regarding bodily injury and psychological trauma. By 2022, all three kidnappers had been paroled.

== Kidnapping ==
On Thursday, July 15, 1976, 55-year-old school bus driver Frank Edward "Ed" Ray was transporting 26 Dairyland Elementary School students home. The children had spent the day on a summer class trip to the Chowchilla Fairgrounds swimming pool. At approximately 4 p.m., a van drove into the bus's path and blocked the road. Ray stopped, and three men with nylon stockings covering their faces exited the van and hijacked the bus. One man pointed a gun at Ray, a second drove the bus, and the third followed in the van.

The kidnappers drove to Berenda Slough (37°09′26″N 120°07′28″W), a shallow branch of the Chowchilla River, where they hid the bus. They retrieved a second van they had hidden nearby. The kidnappers had modified both vans to transport their victims: the rear windows were painted black, and the interiors were insulated with soundproof paneling.

The kidnappers ordered Ray and the children into the vans, then drove them to the California Rock & Gravel quarry (37°39′47.3″N 121°48′32.8″W) in Livermore, roughly 110 miles (180 km) from the fairgrounds. In the early morning hours of July 16, the victims were forced at gunpoint to climb down a ladder, through a hatch, and into an underground bunker.

The kidnappers had buried a truck trailer, converted it into a bunker equipped with ventilation and a pit toilet, and stocked it with several mattresses and a small amount of food and water. As the victims climbed from the van into the bunker, the kidnappers wrote the name and age of each child on a Jack in the Box hamburger wrapper. Once the victims were inside, the kidnappers removed the ladder, covered the hatch with a heavy piece of sheet metal, weighted it with two 100-pound (45-kilogram) industrial batteries, and buried the opening.

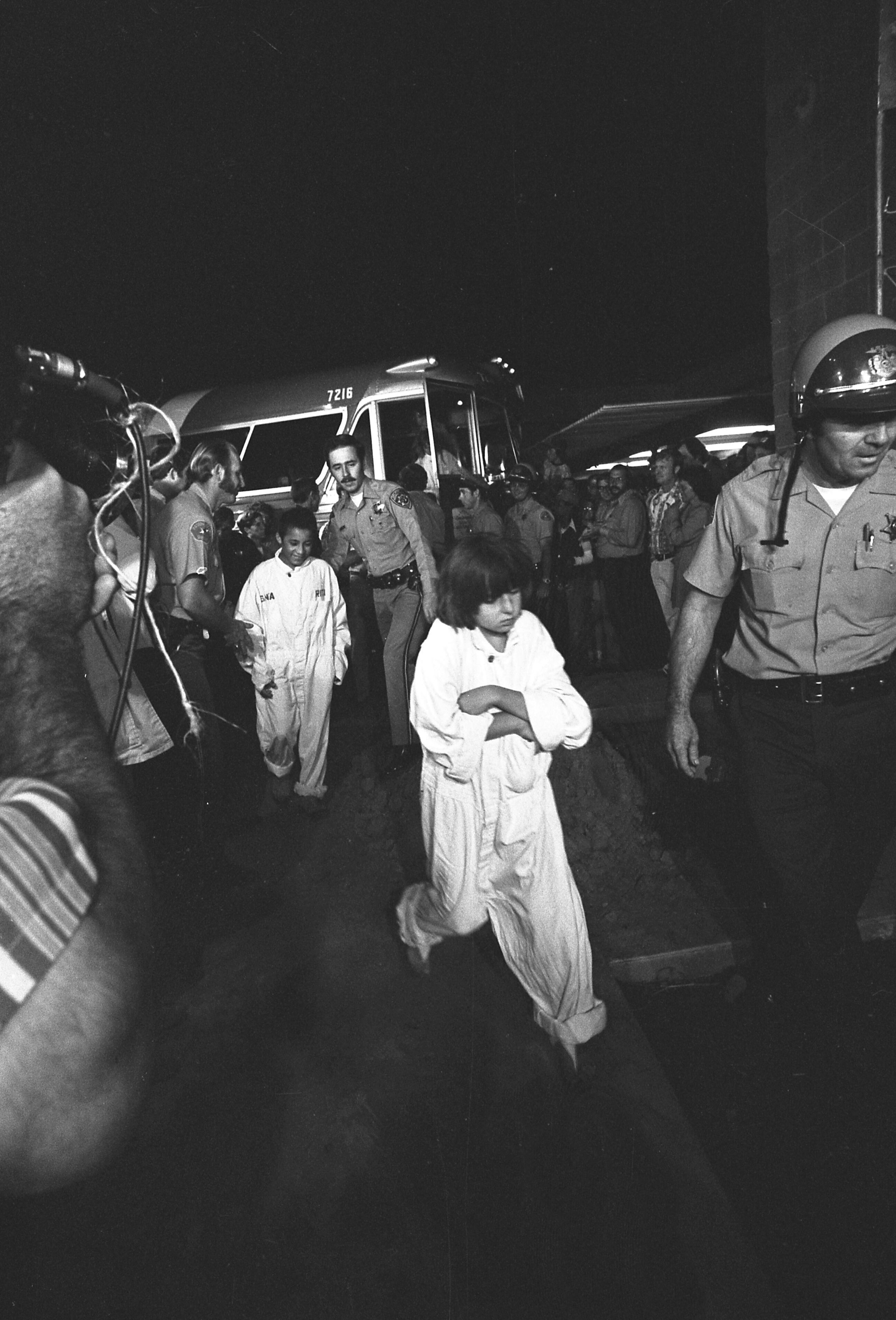
Victims being escorted by Alameda County sheriff's deputies after their escape

After several hours, Ray and the older children stacked the mattresses to reach the hatch. As Ray lifted the hatch, 14-year-old Michael Marshall wedged a piece of wood into the opening, moved the sheet metal and batteries, and dug away the remaining debris covering the entrance. Sixteen hours after being imprisoned, Ray and the children climbed out of the bunker and walked to the quarry guard's shack, near Shadow Cliffs Regional Park.

Alameda County Sheriff's Office deputies responded and took the victims to the county's Santa Rita Jail, the nearest public facility with medical staff. Jail doctors and emergency medical technicians examined and treated them and gave them food and water, while deputies took down statements and descriptions of the kidnappers. The victims were then driven back to their families in Chowchilla.

== Arrests and convictions ==
On July 16, telephone lines to the Chowchilla Police Department were jammed with calls from media and frantic families. The kidnappers were unable to issue their $5 million ransom demand (equivalent to $22 million in 2025). They decided to call back later and fell asleep. When they awoke later in the evening, they saw television news reports that the victims had freed themselves and were safe.

Meanwhile, local law enforcement and the Federal Bureau of Investigation had immediately begun investigating 24-year-old Frederick Newhall Woods IV, the son of Frederick Nickerson Woods III, owner of the California Rock & Gravel quarry. It was discovered that the younger Woods had keys to the quarry providing unlimited access and free use of its facilities. Additionally, Woods and two friends, brothers James and Richard Schoenfeld (aged 24 and 22, respectively), had been previously convicted of motor vehicle theft, for which they were sentenced to probation.

Local law enforcement obtained and executed a search warrant for Hawthorne, the 78-acre Woods estate in Portola Valley, California. In the younger Woods' room, investigators found journals, a draft of the ransom demand, maps, notes, plans, receipts for the vans and the trailer, false identification, one of the guns used in the kidnapping and the hamburger wrapper on which were written the names and ages of each kidnapped child. The notes outlined plans to have the ransom money dropped from a plane into the Santa Cruz Mountains at night and retrieve it under cover of darkness. Also discovered was a rental contract for a storage facility. There, the vans used to transport the victims were found, as well as a getaway vehicle, a Cadillac spray-painted with flat black night camouflage.

Warrants for the arrests of Woods and the two Schoenfeld brothers were issued. Eight days after the kidnapping, Richard Schoenfeld voluntarily surrendered to authorities. Two weeks later, James Schoenfeld was arrested in Menlo Park, California. Later the same day, Woods was arrested in Vancouver, British Columbia, Canada, by the Royal Canadian Mounted Police.

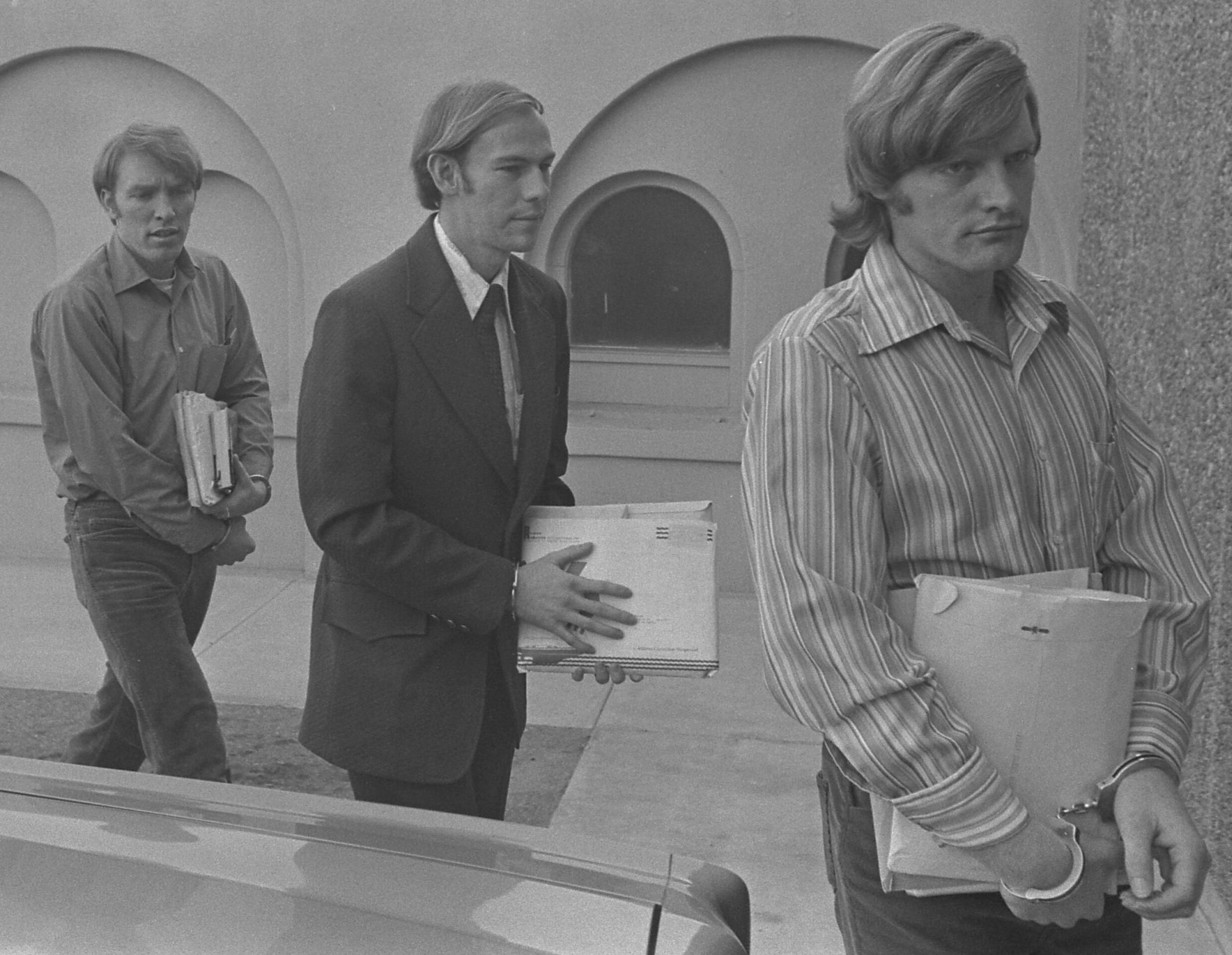
The abductors entering the courthouse for a pre-trial hearing

James Schoenfeld later stated that despite coming from wealthy families, both he and Woods were deeply in debt: "We needed multiple victims to get multiple millions and we picked children because children are precious. The state would be willing to pay ransom for them. And they don't fight back. They're vulnerable. They will mind."

All three pleaded guilty to kidnapping for ransom and robbery but refused to enter a guilty plea to infliction of bodily harm, as a conviction on that count in conjunction with the kidnapping charge carried a mandatory sentence of life in prison without the possibility of parole. They were tried on the bodily harm charge, found guilty and given the mandatory sentence but their convictions were overturned by an appellate court which found that physical injuries sustained by the children (mostly cuts and bruises) did not meet the standard for bodily harm under the law. They were resentenced to life with the possibility of parole. Richard Schoenfeld was released in 2012, and James Schoenfeld was paroled on August 7, 2015.

In 2016, a worker's compensation lawsuit filed against Woods revealed that he had been running several businesses, including a gold mine and a car dealership, from behind bars without notifying prison authorities. The heir to two wealthy California families, the Newhalls and the Woods, he inherited a trust fund from his parents that was described in one court filing as being worth $100 million (equivalent to $131 million in 2025), although Woods' lawyer disputed that amount.

In October 2019, Woods was denied parole for the 19th time. Over the years, reasons given for the denials included his continued minimization of the crime as well as disciplinary infractions for possession of contraband pornography and cellphones. Woods married three times while in prison, and purchased a mansion about half an hour away.

In March 2022, a panel of two commissioners recommended that Woods be granted parole. The recommendation required the approval of the full parole board, the board's legal division, and California's governor. Governor of California Gavin Newsom asked the board to reconsider but the decision was affirmed. On August 17, 2022, it was reported that Woods' parole had been granted and he was to be released from prison.

== Aftermath ==
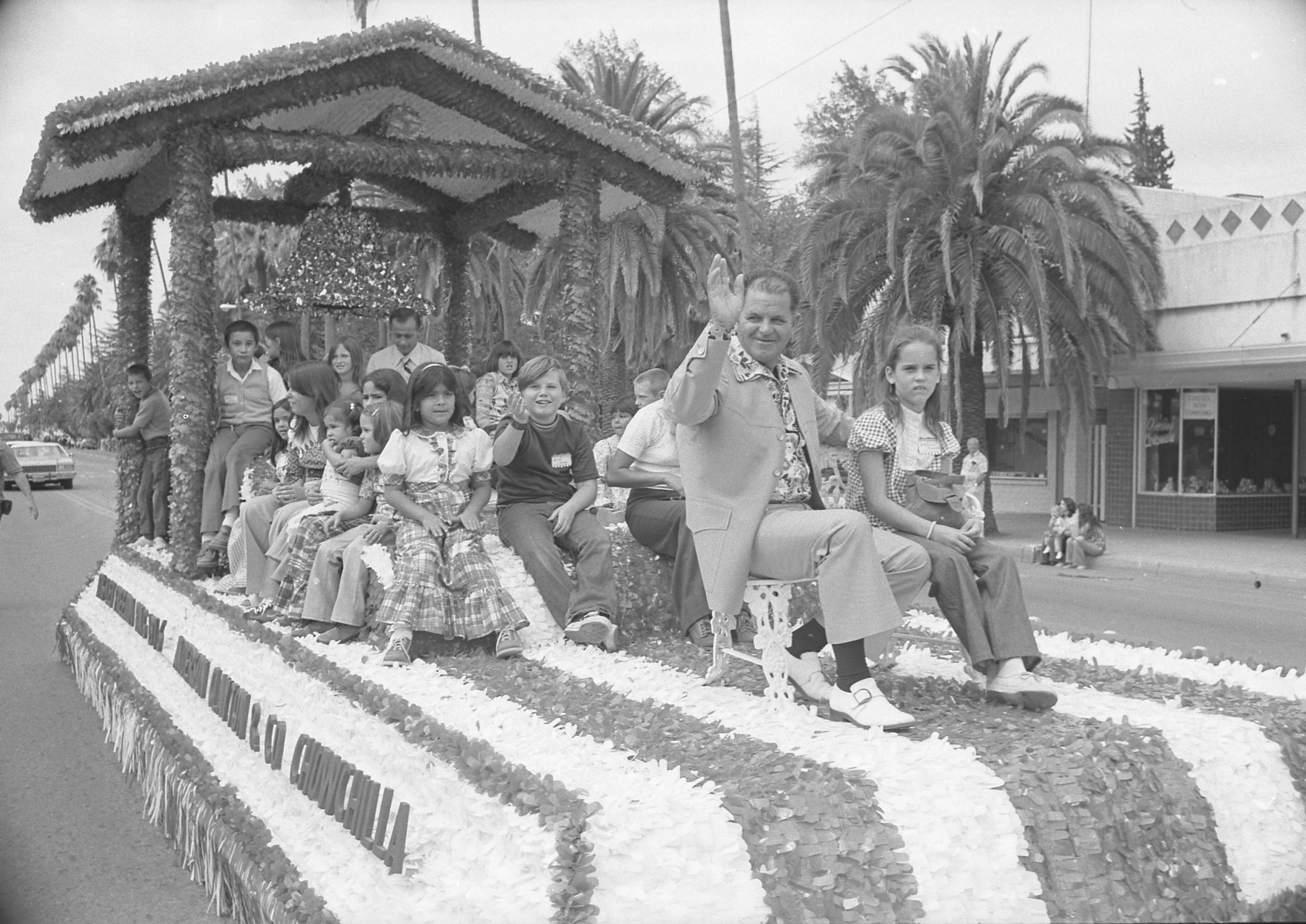
The victims riding in a parade to celebrate their escape

Frank Edward "Ed" Ray, the bus driver, received a citation from the California School Employees Association for outstanding community service. Before he died on May 17, 2012, he was visited by many of the schoolchildren he had helped save. In 2015, Chowchilla renamed the Sports & Leisure Park as the Edward Ray Park, and declared every February 26, Ray's birthdate, as "Edward Ray Day".

A study found that the kidnapped children suffered from panic attacks, nightmares involving kidnappings and death, and personality changes. Many developed fears and phobias such as "cars, the dark, the wind, the kitchen, mice, dogs and hippies", and one shot a Japanese tourist with a BB gun when the tourist's car broke down in front of his home. Many of the children continued to report symptoms of trauma at least 25 years after the kidnapping, including substance abuse and depression, and a number have been imprisoned for "doing something controlling to somebody else." The treatment of young victims of trauma has been guided by what was learned about the effects of the Chowchilla kidnapping on the children who were abducted.

In 2016, the 25 surviving victims settled a lawsuit they had filed against their kidnappers. The money they received was paid out of Frederick Woods' trust fund, and although the exact amount of the settlement was not disclosed, one survivor stated that they had each received "enough to pay for some serious therapy—but not enough for a house."

== Abductors ==
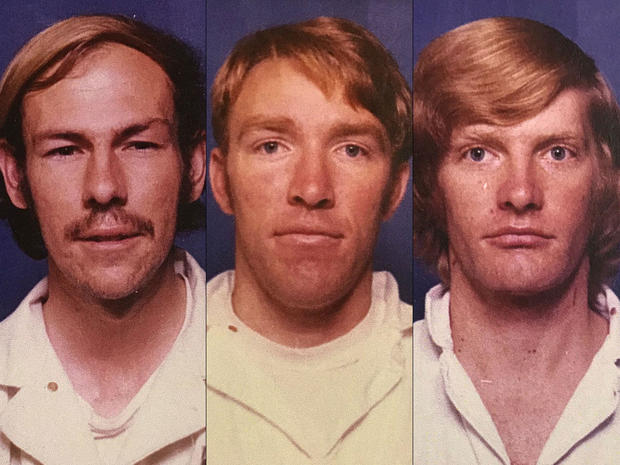
Mugshots of Frederick Woods, James Schoenfeld and Richard Schoenfeld, 1976

- Frederick Newhall Woods IV (aged 24 during the kidnapping) was repeatedly denied parole until August 2022, when, at the age of 70, he was granted full parole. Acquaintances described him as a loner who did not meet his father's expectations.
- James Schoenfeld (aged 24 during the kidnapping) was paroled in 2015 at age 63.
- Richard Schoenfeld (aged 22 during the kidnapping) was paroled in 2012 at age 57.

== In popular culture ==
=== 20th century ===
American crooner Robert Goulet released a ballad about the incident in 1977, entitled "Ballad Of Chowchilla Ray".

The 1978 In Search Of episode "Hypnosis" briefly outlines the start of this kidnapping.

The investigative news program Hard Copy aired a two-part series in 1992 about the kidnapping.

A two-hour made-for-television movie about the incident, titled They've Taken Our Children: The Chowchilla Kidnapping, aired on ABC on March 1, 1993. It stars Karl Malden as Ray, and Julie Harris as his wife.

=== 21st century ===
The kidnappings are featured in "Buried Alive", the seventh episode of Season 2 of Investigation Discovery's House of Horrors: Kidnapped. "Buried Alive" first aired on April 21, 2015, and is told from the point of view of Marshall, the oldest of the children, who was instrumental in their escape.

48 Hours examines the abduction in the 2019 episode "Live to Tell: The Chowchilla Kidnapping", as well as the March 18, 2023, episode "Remembering the Chowchilla Kidnapping" (Season 36, Episode 20).

In 2022, an Inside Edition episode titled "1976 Chowchilla Kidnapping Survivors Share Their Stories" reunited some of the women who had been kidnapped as children. They gave their recollections of the abduction. The school bus, which is now stored in a Chowchilla farm warehouse, was shown as well.

On December 3, 2023, CNN aired a documentary on the kidnapping, simply titled Chowchilla.

2025 cross over episodes of Sheriff Country ( S1:E13 “The Finest”) and Fire Country (S4:E13 “The Bravest”) featured a kidnapping of high school students from a hijacked school bus being held for ransom in a shipping container buried in the middle of a quarry.

== See also ==
- 1972 Faraday School kidnapping
- 2013 Alabama bunker hostage crisis
- List of kidnappings (1970–1979)
- PTSD in children and adolescents
