= Perry Askam =

American opera singer

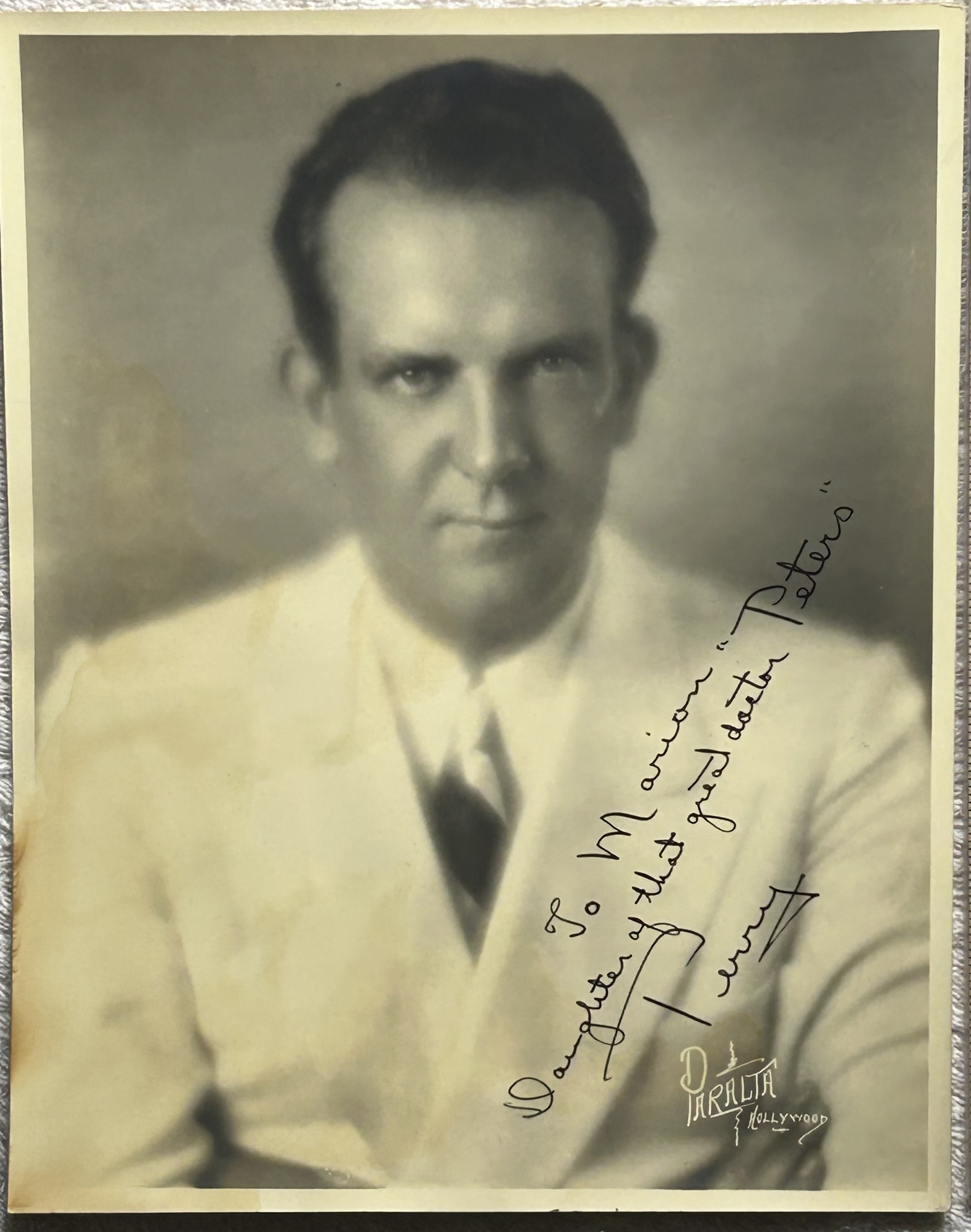
- Askam Inscribed Photo
- Born: 1898
- Died: 1961 (aged 62–63)
- Occupations: baritone singer, actor
- Years active: 1920s–1950s
- Spouse: Frances

Perry Askam (1898–1961) was a 20th-century American actor and baritone singer, most active in musical theatre and opera around the San Francisco area.

Askam was born in 1898 to Oliver and Helena Askam. Helena was the daughter of ferryman and land magnate Henry Rengstorff. Perry was orphaned at a young age, and went to live with his maternal aunt, Elisa Haag, whom he came to view as a second mother. A little later Elisa and Perry moved into Rengstorff House with Perry's grandmother Christina Rengstorff, widow of Henry. On this expansive property Perry worked the ranch, working with cattle and in the grain fields while attending local school. He then attended the Santa Clara University, studying music.

Askam joined the French army during World War I, and when the United States entered on the side of the Allies, he transferred to the American Ambulance Corps. At war's end, he relocated to New York and appeared in Broadway performances.

Askam played the San Francisco production of Castles in the Air in 1927. In 1928 he performed in The Desert Song at the Curran Theatre.

He was in the Los Angeles production of The New Moon. This engagement led to a recording of the musical's songs "Stouthearted Men" and "Lover Come Back to Me". Joel Whitburn estimates this recording (released on Victor Records 22317) would have been listed as a best seller if the Billboard Hot 100 had existed.

Askam had a significant role in the 1930 Warner Brothers musical film Sweet Kitty Bellairs in which he sang lead in several numbers, not surprising in that he was the only professional singer in the cast.

Askam spent two seasons with the San Francisco Opera. Askam performed the role of Count Almaviva in the 1936 production of Mozart's The Marriage of Figaro. He had two roles for San Francisco's 1937 season, both in works by Charles Gounod, first as Mercutio in his Roméo et Juliette and then as Valentin in Faust. He joined the New York-based New Opera Company in 1941 for a performance of Mozart's then-rarely-heard Così fan tutte.

In 1945 Perry and his wife Frances moved back to Rengstorff House to look after his aunt Elise. He made regular concert appearances with the San Francisco Symphony. Perry lived at his ancestral home until 1959. He died in 1961.

== Filmography ==
- Sweet Kitty Bellairs (1930) – Captain O'Hara
- The Crusades (1935) – Soldier
