= Mayfield Mall =

Shopping mall in Mountain View, California

- Location: Mountain View and Palo Alto, California, United States
- Coordinates: 37°24′33″N 122°6′19″W
- Address: 100 Mayfield Avenue
- Opened: October 5, 1966
- Closed: January 1984
- Developer: Albert A. Hoover and Associates; Hare, Brewer and Kelley, Inc.
- Num. of stores: 24
- Num. of anchor tenants: 1
- Floor area: 500,000 sq ft (46,000 m^{2})
- Floors: 3

Mayfield Mall was a shopping mall in Mountain View, California, United States. Operational from 1966 to 1984, it was the first air-conditioned, enclosed shopping mall in Northern California, though it has been an office complex since the 1980s. In 2013, Google rented the entire 500,000 square feet (46,000 m^{2}) property and ultimately purchased it in 2016 for $225 million and is known as the company's Building RLS1.

== As a mall ==
Mayfield Mall opened in 1966 and was the first enclosed mall of its type in the region, taking its name from the original town of Mayfield, which was annexed by Palo Alto in 1925. Its original anchor was JCPenney, which closed stores on Castro Street and University Avenue to consolidate into the mall location. At the time, the JCPenney outlet was the chain's largest suburban location. There were 24 original tenants, notably including Joseph Magnin and Woolworth. The mall declared itself the first enclosed and carpeted center in the United States.

JCPenney announced it would close its branch there in May 1983, sounding an immediate death knell for a small center with no room to grow; after the mall's ownership found no way to lure another anchor tenant, it closed in January 1984. The JCPenney store moved to the San Antonio Shopping Center, where it would last until the mid-1990s. Several outlets, as well as a Greyhound bus terminal, continued to operate.

== Office era ==
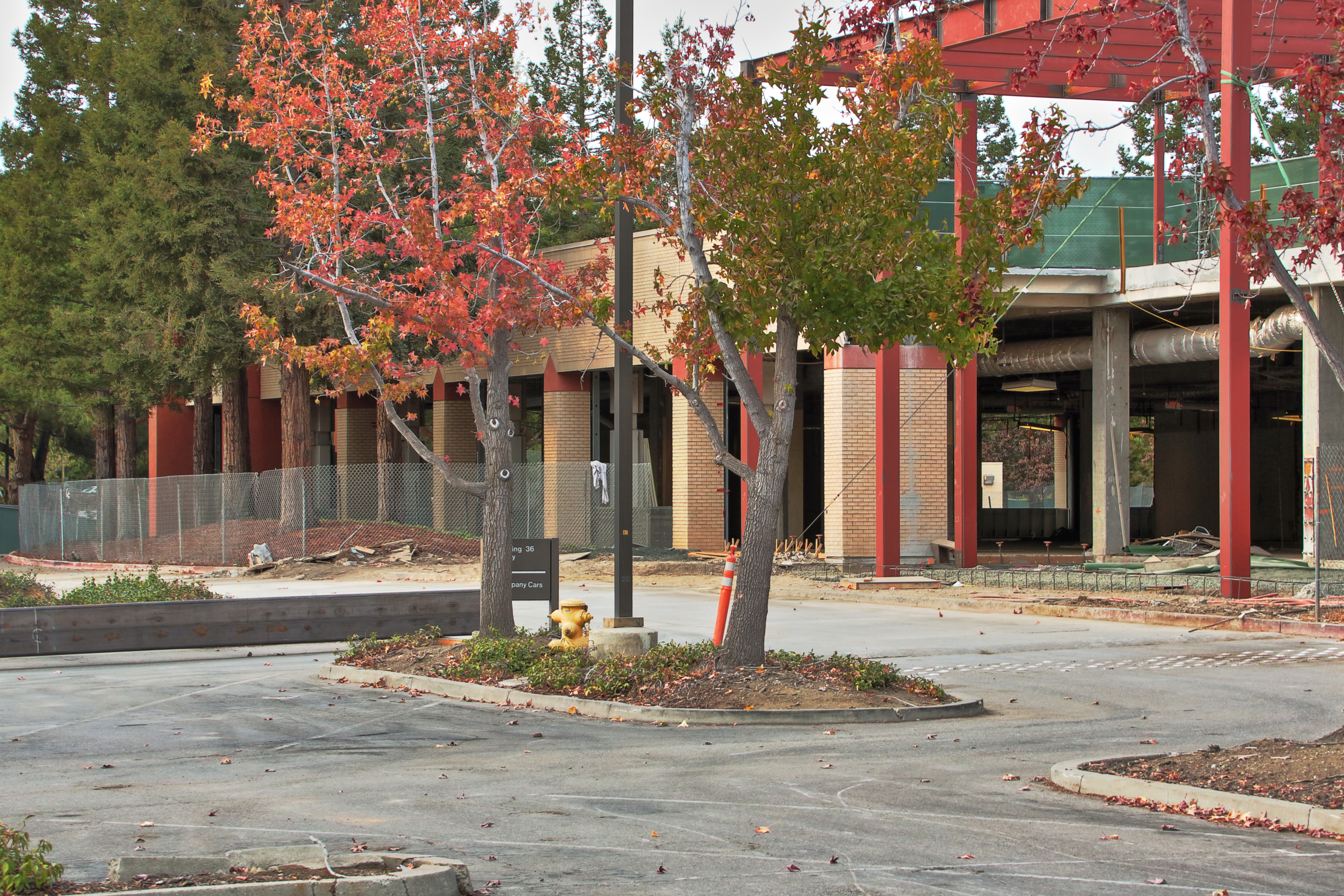
South side of the mall in 2013

After the mall's closure, Hewlett-Packard became the mall's only tenant and renovated the structure to serve as offices, adding an atrium and high ceilings. Under HP, the building housed the company's American response center and some 1,600 workers. However, in the early 2000s, HP opted to consolidate into other office spaces, leaving the mall vacant. By 2003, the old mall was on the market after a deal to sell to Stanford Hospital failed over zoning issues. The property was bought by Rockwood Capital and Four Corners Properties for $90 million in 2012, after William Lyons Homes, which had hoped to develop a 260-unit housing complex on the site and demolish the mall, went into bankruptcy. Rockwood and Four Corners instead sought to remodel the site and maintain the office use, renaming the complex San Antonio Station.

In September 2013, Google rented the entire mall in the largest lease deal of the year in Silicon Valley. Google is not the only large tech company to buy and renovate a former mall for office use; the headquarters of Rackspace are located at the former Windsor Park Mall near San Antonio, Texas. Three years into the lease deal, Google purchased the entire property.

== See also ==
- Monta Loma, Mountain View
