= Geological history of Point Lobos =

Point Lobos State Reserve
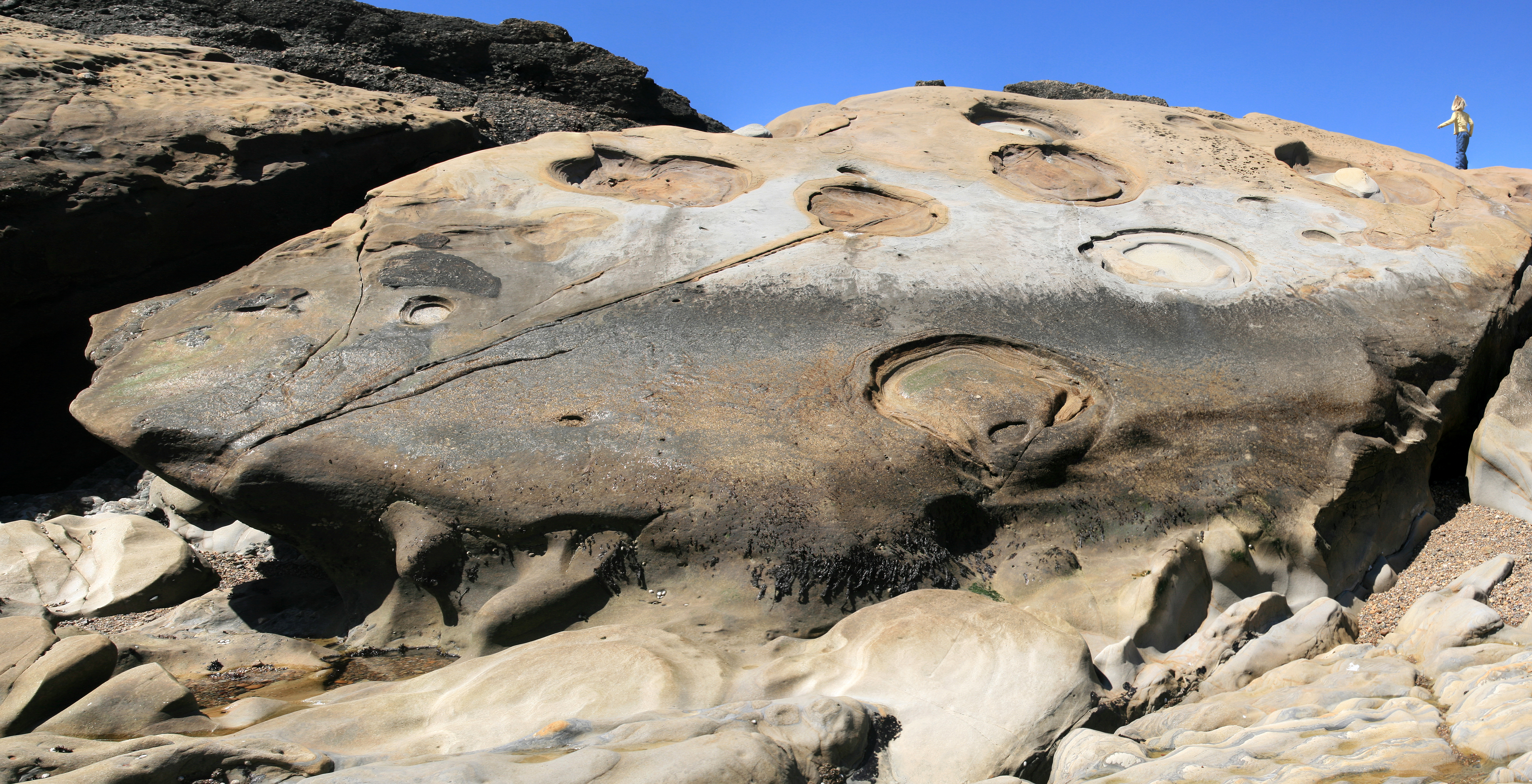
- Interactive map of Point Lobos State Reserve
- Location: Point Lobos, Monterey County, California
- Nearest city: Carmel-by-the-Sea
- Coordinates: 36°31′1.56″N 121°56′33.36″W
- Governing body: California Department of Parks and Recreation

The geological history of Point Lobos, regarding the Point Lobos headland on the Central Coast in Monterey County, California.

The area's geology encompasses the last 80 million years. The oldest rocks exposed here were formed during the Cretaceous Period of the Mesozoic Era, when the dinosaurs still roamed the earth and pterodactyls dominated the sky. The area forms part of the Salinian Block, a sliver of continental crust caught up in the transform boundary between the Pacific and North American Plates.

Point Lobos is the common name for the landform and area, which include Point Lobos State Reserve on land; and two adjoining marine protected areas: Point Lobos State Marine Reserve (SMR) and Point Lobos State Marine Conservation Area.

== Santa Lucia Granodiorite ==
During the Cretaceous period the west coast of North America was the site of an active chain of volcanoes. Active subduction created magma chambers that fed the volcanoes. This magma cooled slowly at depths of 10–20 km below the earth's surface to form a granitic intrusion known as the Santa Lucia Granodiorite. Granodiorite is made of quartz, orthoclase, plagioclase, amphibole, and biotite mica. Radiometric data indicate an age of 79.5 million years for the granodiorite. Over the next 30 million years the Santa Lucia Granodiorite rose to the earth's surface and was eroded. The granodiorite provides the basement rock for the younger sedimentary deposits of Point Lobos.

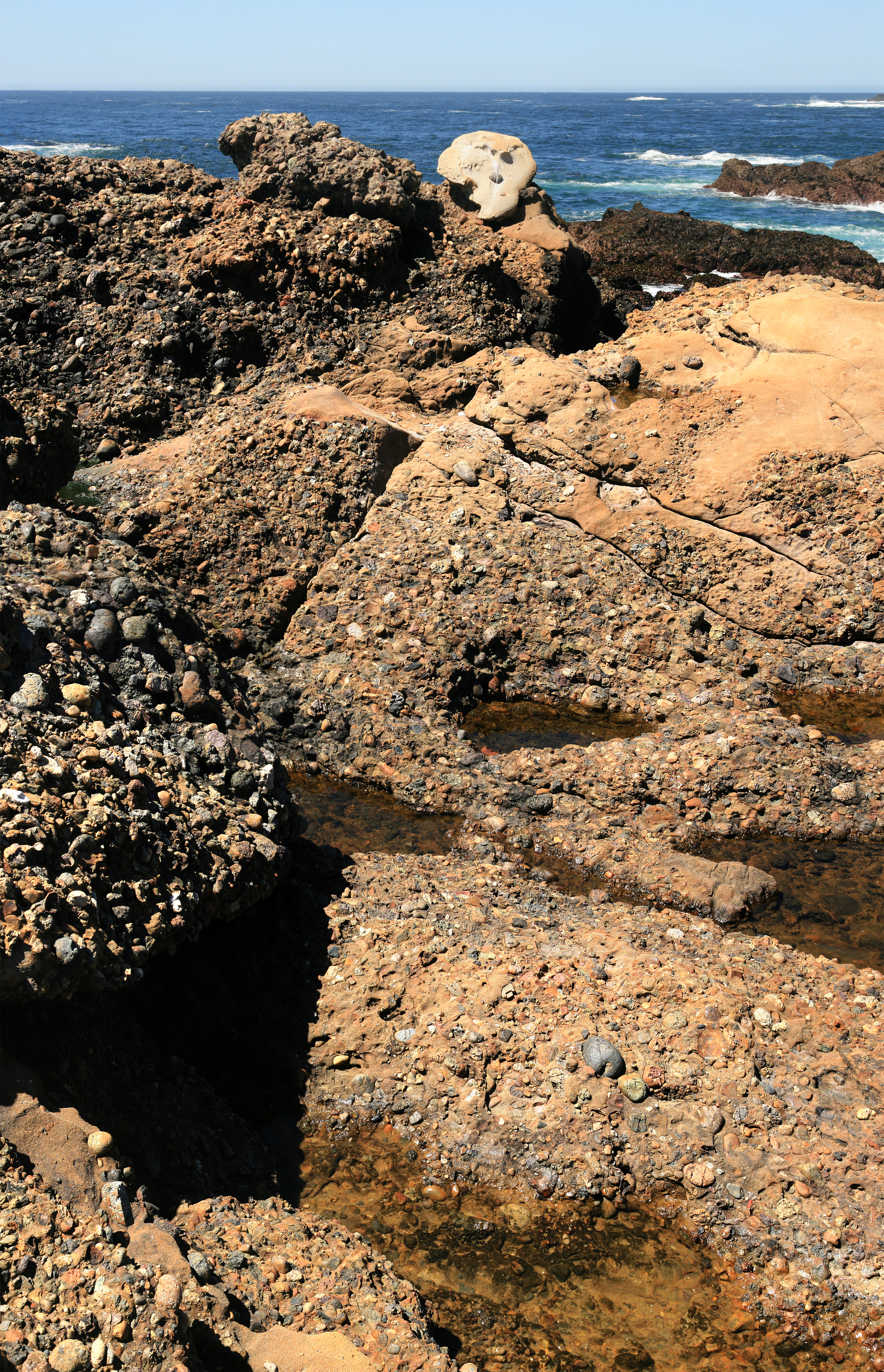
Carmelo Formation at Point Lobos.

== Carmelo Formation ==
Around 55 million years ago, in the Paleocene Epoch of the Paleogene Period (Cenozoic Era), a submarine canyon cut down through the granodiorite basement rock and sediments comprising the Carmelo Formation were deposited. The Carmelo consists of pebble to cobble conglomerate, medium to coarse grained sandstone and mudstone. The included pebbles are mostly of volcanic origin. They were brought by rivers draining volcanic highlands. During transport their rough shape became rounded and polished. The sediments were deposited as submarine landslides and turbidity currents.

Fossils include shells, burrows that were made up by worms, and mysterious seaweed-like trace fossils. The shells, pebbles, and other material were deposited, together with sand and mud, within the walls of submarine canyons and became lithified. The Carmelo Formation is the second major rock type at Point Lobos. The Carmelo is easily recognizable along the southern shore of Point Lobos.

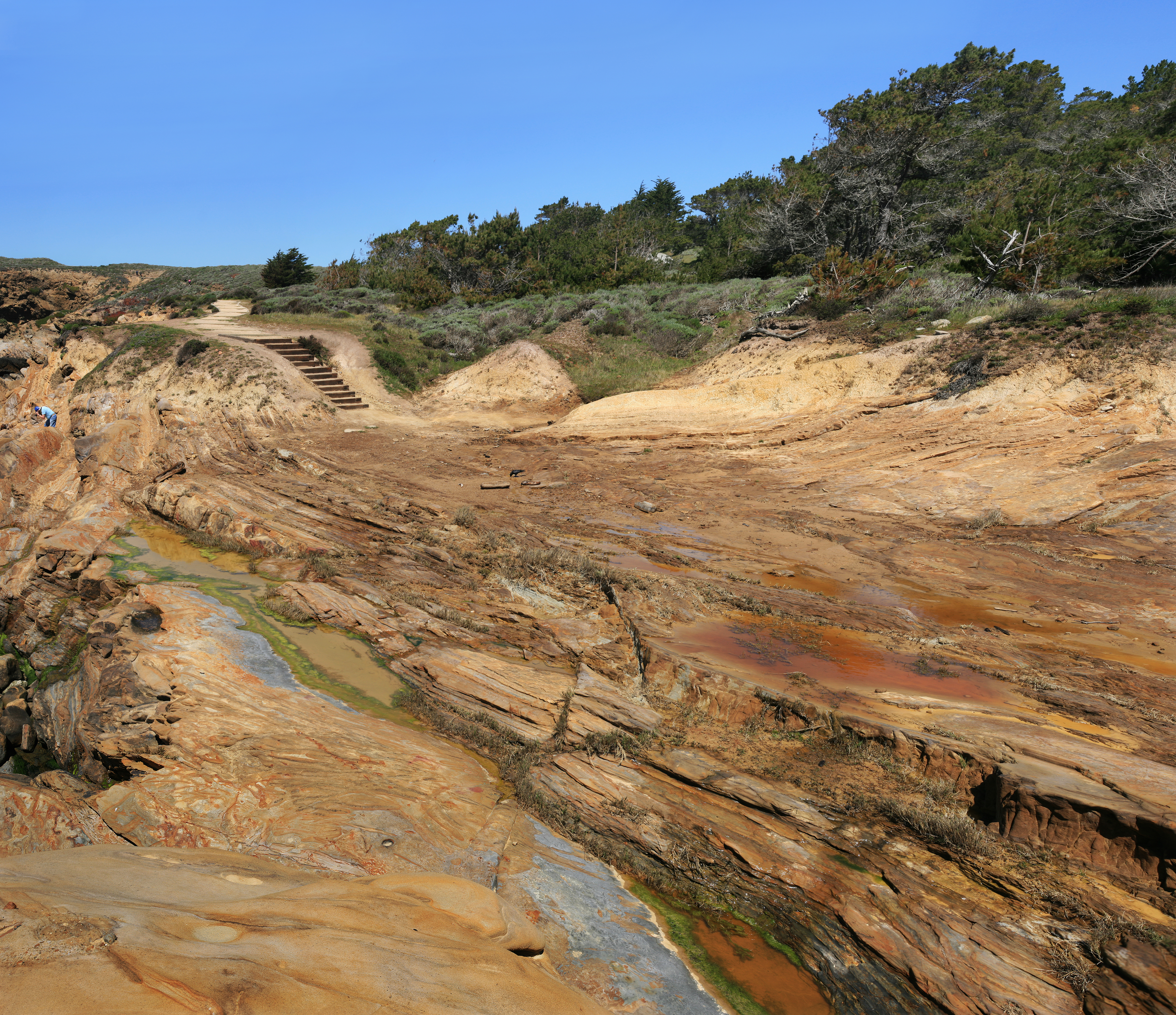
Sandstone rock formation at Point Lobos.

== Marine terraces ==
About 18,000 years ago, during the Pleistocene Epoch of the Quaternary Period (Cenozoic Era), the level of the Pacific Ocean was considerably lower than it is now (because more water was in the polar ice-caps and continental glaciers). Deep submarine canyons were cut in the Monterey Bay area, as an extension of the Salinas River.

During late Cenozoic Era, because of sustained transpression of the Pacific Plate onto the American Plate along the nearby San Andreas Fault Zone, there was continued uplift of the entire coastline of California, so that erosive action of marine waves cut these terraces in the Monterey Bay area. Those Pleistocene marine terraces are composed of clay, silt, sand and gravel with a basal unconformity of gravel on top of rock. The creation of uplifted marine terraces that started to appear during the Pleistocene Epoch continues throughout the (present) Holocene Epoch of the Quaternary Period due to transpression of the Pacific Plate onto the American Plate. During the October 1989 Loma Prieta earthquake, the marine terraces of the Monterey Bay were further uplifted. Both Monterey and Santa Cruz have classical uplifted wave-cut shorelines with multiple sets of uplifted and exposed marine terraces.

== Sand and gravel ==
The fourth and the youngest type of rocks is sand and gravel. It is found along the beaches. Once again it has been created by the action of waves and rain that cause erosion of the others type of rocks. The age of this kind of rocks varies from ten thousand years ago up to the present day.

== See also ==
- Geology of Monterey County, California
- Geologic formations of California
