= Newman's College =

Newman's College was one of the earliest forms of a sports bar. It operated as Newman's College Inn and Newman's College, a liquor store, between about 1906 and 1919 in Oakland, California and San Francisco, California.

== History ==
Newman's College was operated by Charles and Layo Newman.

Its San Francisco location burned in the fire following the 1906 earthquake.

Newman's College is noted for its surviving collegiate sports memorabilia.

The college apparently closed with the beginning of Prohibition.
