= Manuela Budrow =

Spanish-born American soprano, composer and music educator

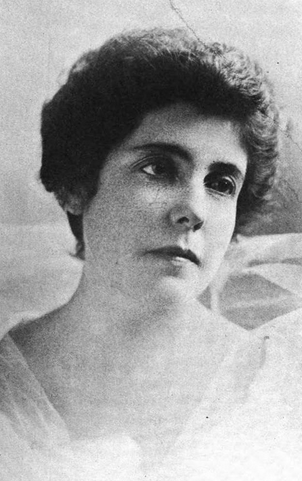
Manuela V. Budrow, from a 1920 publication.

Manuela Valera Budrow (1876–1966), also known as Manuela Budrow Rafferty, was a Spanish-born American soprano, composer, and music educator based in Southern California.

== Early life ==
Manuela Valera was born in Spain and studied music in Madrid.

== Career ==
Budrow sang in Mexico and in Los Angeles, California, where she was a regular concert performer and a soloist at several churches. She was especially known for performing the works of Charles Wakefield Cadman. She was also a popular performer in Santa Ana, California, where she lived after 1923, and where she directed a church choir.

Describing her voice, the Santa Ana Register said "Hers is an organ that defies absolute classificationas it is at will dramatic, lyrical, florid, brilliant, mellow, warm or cold. It possesses all the charming characteristics of the Spanish voice and the idiosyncrasies peculiar to the methods of Latin race vocalists, being most successful in the temperamental type of music native to the southern climes." Late in life, she was a faculty member of the Los Angeles Conservatory of Music and Arts.

She was a member of the American Guild of Musical Artists, the National Association of Teachers of Singing, the California Music Teachers Association, and the Orange County Council of Catholic Women. She was on the faculty of the Anaheim Conservatory or Music from 1924 to 1926.

In 1929, as sound pictures began production, Budrow opened a studio in Hollywood, while still teaching voice classes on weekends in Santa Ana. She composed music for two films, The Tia Juana Kid and The Irish Gringo, both released in 1935. She also wrote a musical play, Brigands of the Sea, and wrote the music for another, The Mystery of Dolores of Las Flores Rancho.

== Personal life ==
Manuela Valera married William Budrow, an American engineer who worked in South America. They had a son Robert Gabriel (1905–1963), and two daughters, Rebecca (1907–1994) and Mary Louise (1910–2005); the children were born in Mexico. Manuela Budrow was widowed in 1922, while her children were young, and moved to Santa Ana to live closer to her husband's family. She married again in 1930, and was a widow again when her second husband Fred Rafferty died Feb 22, 1931, from pneumonia. Manuela Valera Budrow Rafferty died in 1966, aged 90 years. Her gravesite is in Santa Ana, California.
