= List of people from Eureka, California =

The following list includes notable people who were born or have lived in Eureka, California.

== Academics and writing ==
Name	Image	Birth	Death	Known for	Association	Reference
Vincent Gaddis		Dec 28, 1913	Feb 26, 1997	Author and creator of the term "Bermuda Triangle"	Born in Eureka	
Joseph T. Gregory		Jul 28, 1914	Nov 18, 2007	Paleontologist and professor	Lived and died in Eureka	

== Business and philanthropy ==
Name	Image	Birth	Death	Known for	Association	Reference
Hans Ditlev Bendixsen		Oct 14, 1842	Feb 12, 1902	Shipbuilder; instrumental in the development of the merchant marine industry on the West Coast of the United States	Lived in Eureka	
Betty Kwan Chinn (also known as 關惠群)				Philanthropist	Lives in Eureka	
Charles Noski		Aug 23, 1952		Bank of America Corp Vice Chairman	Born in Eureka	
Myron Spaulding		Oct 28, 1905	Sep 11, 2000	Sailor, ship builder, and concert violinist	Born in Eureka	

== Media and art ==
Name	Image	Birth	Death	Known for	Association	Reference
Ray Jerome Baker		Dec 1, 1880	Oct 1972	Photographer	Lived in Eureka	
Luke Burbank		May 8, 1976		Radio host	Born in Eureka	
Emma B. Freeman		1880	1928	Photographer	Lived in Eureka	
Jeff Jordan				Artist	Born in Eureka	
Seth Kinman		Sep 29, 1815	Feb 24, 1888	Performer; hunter for Fort Humboldt	Lived in Eureka	
Matthew Monahan		1972		Artist	Born in Eureka	
Jimmy Swinnerton		Nov 13, 1875	Sep 8, 1974	Cartoonist and landscape painter	Born in Eureka	
Brian Tripp		April 6, 1945	May 3, 2022	Sculptor, mixed-media artist, poet	Born in Eureka	
Robert Whiting		Oct 24, 1942		Author and journalist	Grew up in Eureka	

=== Acting ===
Name	Image	Birth	Death	Known for	Association	Reference
Lloyd Bridges		Jan 15, 1913	Mar 10, 1998	Actor	Eureka High graduate, owner of historic buildings	
Sarah Joy Brown		Feb 18, 1975		Actress	Born in Eureka	
Steve Cochran		May 25, 1917	Jun 15, 1965	Actor	Born in Eureka	
Brendan Fraser		Dec 3, 1968		Actor	Lived in Eureka as a child	
Warner Jones		Dec 17, 1928	Dec 23, 2010	Actor	Lived and died in Eureka	
Minerva Urecal		Sep 22, 1894	Feb 26, 1966	Actress	Born in Eureka	

=== Music ===
- Sara Bareilles, musical artist
- Blackhouse (Brian Ladd), musical artist
- Trevor Dunn, musical artist
- Ernie Earnshaw, musician
- Mindy Gledhill, musical artist
- El Hefe (Aaron Abeyta), musical artist
- Mel Lyman, musician and filmmaker
- Alexander McCurdy, organist and educator
- Michael Moore, musician
- Mr. Bungle, experimental rock band formed in Eureka
- Parasite (Armin Elsaesser), musician
- Mike Patton, musical artist and lead vocalist of Faith No More
- Trey Spruance, musical artist

== Military ==
- Robert Hale Merriman, Chief of Staff of the Abraham Lincoln Battalion, killed in action in the Spanish Civil War
- Robert M. Viale, U.S. Medal of Honor recipient
- Stephen Girard Whipple, 49er, newspaper editor, Union Army officer, and politician

== Politics and law ==
- Bob L. Beers, politician
- David Cobb, presidential candidate and orator
- Thomas Cottrell, politician
- James G. Crichton, politician
- James Gillett, governor of California
- Peter D. Hannaford, political adviser and author associated with Ronald W. Reagan
- Frank C. Newman, Supreme Court of California associate justice

=== Crime ===
- Wayne Adam Ford, serial killer

== Sports ==
=== Baseball ===
- Lafayette Henion, Major League baseball pitcher
- Dane Iorg, Major League baseball player
- Garth Iorg, Major League baseball player
- John Jaso, Major League baseball catcher and designated hitter
- Eddie Kearse, Major League baseball catcher
- Bill Kenworthy, Major League baseball player
- Roy Partee, Major League baseball catcher
- Greg Shanahan, Major League baseball pitcher
- Ned Yost, Major League baseball manager

=== Basketball ===
- Al Brightman, basketball player and coach
- Mo Charlo, professional basketball player

=== Bowling ===
- Walter Ray Williams, Jr., professional bowler

=== Cricket ===
- Dennis Silk, cricketer

=== Football ===
- Dave Harper, football player
- Rey Maualuga, professional football player
- Mike Nott, professional football player
- Maurice Purify, professional football player
- Elbie Schultz (1917–2002), collegiate All-American and NFL football player
- John Woodcock, football player

=== Martial arts ===
- Nate Quarry, professional fighter

=== Rowing ===
- Kevin Still, Olympic bronze medalist in rowing

=== Volleyball ===
- Heather Erickson, Paralympic volleyball player
