= Rengstorff House =

Historic house in California, United States

- Henry A. Rengstorff House
- U.S. National Register of Historic Places
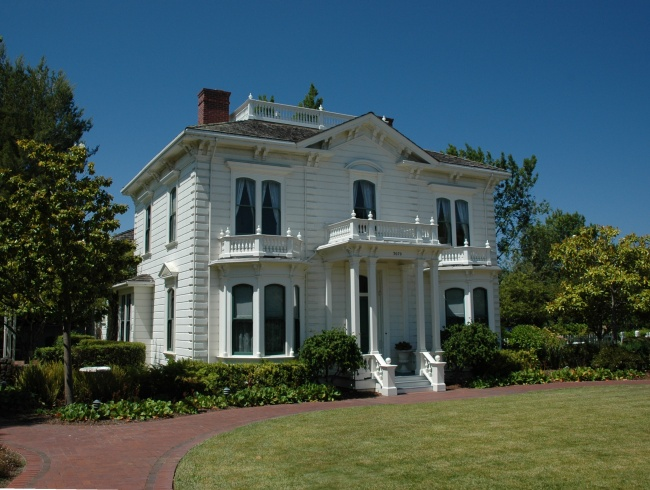
- The Rengstorff House

- Location within San Jose, California Location within California Location within the United States
- Location: 3070 N. Shoreline Blvd. Mountain View, California
- Coordinates: 37°25′53.24″N 122°5′13.56″W
- Area: 2 acres (0.81 ha)
- Architectural style: Italianate
- NRHP reference No.: 78000778
- Added to NRHP: June 13, 1978

The Rengstorff House is a historic house and museum, being one of the first houses to be built in Mountain View, California, circa. 1867, by Henry Rengstorff, a prominent local businessman who operated a ferry between San Francisco and Mountain View. It is built in the Italianate Victorian architecture style. The house's three-bay front facade features an entrance pavilion topped by a balustrade and a pediment on the middle bay.

== History ==
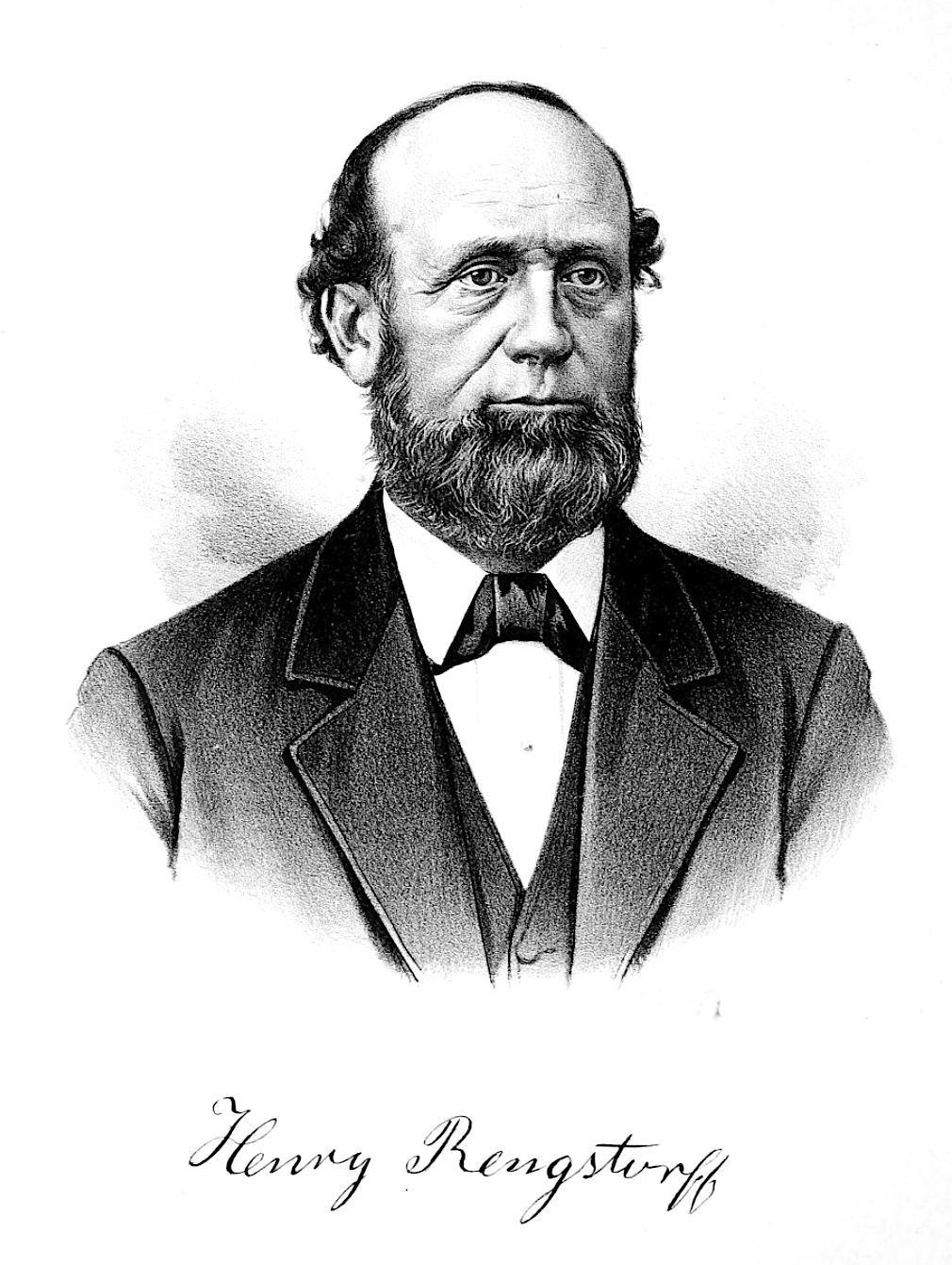
Henry Rengstorff, c. 1888

Henry Rengstorff built the house near Rengstorff Landing, an important grain shipping point. The house was built to demonstrate his prosperity, and to raise his six children in comfort, including a room built solely for his four girls, to accommodate their regular appointment with a dressmaker to try on the latest fashions. When Rengstorff died in 1906, his daughter Elise Haag and grandson Perry Askam moved into the house. Descendants of Rengstorff would live in the house until 1959. The ranch on which the house was located was purchased by the Newhall Development Company, which had no use for the house; a 1972 plan to move it was aborted.

In 1976, Frederick Woods, and James and Richard Schoenfeld launched their plan to preserve the mansion and make it their private residence at the intersection of Middlefield Road and Independence Street, to realize a dream of living in a grand, fully restored and modernized Victorian mansion. Needing $60,000 (equivalent to $339,000 in 2025) to realize the plan, they hatched the plan later known as the infamous Chowchilla kidnapping. When all the children and their bus driver were able to escape, they were arrested and sentenced to life in prison, ending this plan for the house.

After the house was placed on the National Register of Historic Places in 1978, Mountain View mayor Richard Wilmuth wanted to restore it in place. Construction encroached and in January 1979 a company planning to construct an industrial park on the house's land suggested it be moved north to Shoreline Park. The land was purchased by the city in 1979 and the house was moved onto Shoreline Park land in January 1980. To make way for the Marine World/Africa USA theme park the house was moved again in 1986, further into Shoreline Park, to its current location. After a major renovation costing about $1,000,000 (equivalent to $2,364,000 in 2025), funded by the city, the house was opened to the public in April 1991. It has since been used as a museum and to host weddings and miscellaneous events; as of 2023 it is open to the public on Tuesdays, Wednesdays, and Saturdays or Online 24/7 via 3D tour.

== See also ==
- National Register of Historic Places listings in Santa Clara County, California
