= List of people from Bolinas, California =

Bolinas, California is an unincorporated community in Marin County, California with a reputation as an art colony. This list includes any notable people known to have resided in Bolinas.

- Donald Allen, editor, publisher
- Dawn-Michelle Baude, poet
- Bill Berkson, poet
- Ted Berrigan, poet
- Peg Bracken, author
- Joe Brainard, artist and writer
- Richard Brautigan, writer
- Gail Carriger, writer
- Jim Carroll, author, poet, rock musician
- C. West Churchman, philosopher
- Suzanne Ciani, electronic music pioneer
- Tom Clark, poet, biographer
- Joel Coen, one of the Coen Brothers, screenwriter, film director
- Signy Coleman, actress
- Clark Coolidge, poet
- Robert Creeley, poet, author
- Stephen Emerson, author
- Paulette Frankl, artist, photographer, biographer
- Robert Grenier, poet
- Paul Harris, sculptor and lithographer
- Ilka Hartman, photographer
- Bobbie Louise Hawkins, poet
- Stephan Jenkins, singer, songwriter, Third Eye Blind frontman.
- Paul Kantner, rhythm guitarist, rock vocalist, songwriter
- Harmony Korine, film director, producer, screenwriter
- Joanne Kyger, poet with ties to the Beat Generation
- Anne Lamott, nonfiction author
- Kenneth Lamott, writer
- Annie Leibovitz, photographer
- Michael Lerner, integrative health pioneer, MacArthur grant recipient
- Mary Tuthill Lindheim, sculptor and studio potter
- Lewis MacAdams, poet, author
- Jerry Mander, activist, author
- Paul McCandless, master oboist, reed player, co-founded Oregon, world class musician
- Frances McDormand, actress
- Barry McGee, artist
- Duncan McNaughton, poet
- David Meltzer, poet
- Walter Murch, Academy Award-winning film editor, sound mixer
- Bill Niman, founder with Orville Schell of Niman-Schell Ranch Meats
- Alice Notley, poet
- Arthur Okamura, painter and silk screen artist
- Guy Overfelt, conceptual artist
- Gladys Kathleen Parkin, wireless radio operator
- Ponponio Lupugeyun, Coast Miwok, born c. 1799 to the Guaulen local tribe area of present-day Bolinas; insurgent
- Bill Rafferty, television personality
- Stephen Ratcliffe, poet
- Charles A. Reich, professor of law at Yale University, author
- Aram Saroyan, poet, novelist, playwright
- Strawberry Saroyan, journalist and author
- Orville Schell, dean of the UC Berkeley Graduate School of Journalism co-founder with Bill Niman of Niman-Schell Ranch Meats
- Tony Serra, radical civil rights attorney, tax resister
- Grace Slick, rock singer, songwriter
- Sean Thackrey, winemaker
- Susie Tompkins Buell, founder of Esprit
- Lewis Warsh, writer and artist
- Peter Warshall, ecologist, member of the board of directors of the Bolinas Community Public Utility District
- Philip Whalen, poet
- Michael Wolfe, poet, author, publisher, documentary film producer
- Lloyd Kahn, publisher, editor, author, photographer, carpenter, and self-taught architect
