= History of Santa Clara County, California =

Santa Clara County, California, is one of California's original counties, with prior habitation dating from prehistory to the Alta California period.

== Early history ==
The first documented inhabitants included the Ohlone, residing on Coyote Creek and Calaveras Creek, although Santa Clara Valley undoubtedly had known earlier Indian inhabitants and migrations, now lost to history and prehistory. Archaeological discoveries place Ohlone settlements in the region as early as 8000 BC. Sometime around 4000 years ago, according to anthropologists, the ancestral Ohlone, along with the culturally interrelated people of the greater Sacramento-San Joaquin River Delta region, developed a system of social ranking and institutional religions. Within the greater San Francisco Bay region, people of social prominence were interred in what has become known as the "shellmounds".

== Europeans arrive ==
The European presence in the region began with the Spanish explorer Juan Rodriguez Cabrillo, The arrival of the Spanish started when Russian exploration into California alarmed the Spanish viceroy in Mexico City. The Russians had settled Alaska and were exploring the West Coast for trading posts within striking distance of the rich Spanish mines. They were a presence at Fort Ross in Northern California from 1812 to 1841. José de Gálvez, the visitor-general of New Spain, wanted to increase New Spain's territory for the Spanish crown. He sent the Spanish forward into Alta California (present day California). Encountering the native Ohlone people, the Spanish gave them the name of Costeños, or People of the Coast. José Francisco Ortega gave Santa Clara the name "Llano de los Robles" ("Plain of the Oaks") in 1769 as he scouted the region on the behalf of Captain Gaspar de Portolà.

Father Junípero Serra also came into present-day California, establishing a chain of Franciscan missions. It was in 1777 that Father Serra gave Santa Clara Valley its lasting name when he consecrated the Mission Santa Clara de Asís, which is named for Saint Clare of Assisi, Italy. The name "Clare" or "Clara" means "clear" or "bright." The 8th of the 21 established missions, Mission Santa Clara de Asís claimed land from San Francisquito Creek in present-day Palo Alto to Llagas Creek at Gilroy.

San Jose was California's first town. On November 29, 1777, on orders from the Spanish viceroy of Mexico, nine soldiers, five pobladores (settlers) with their families, and one cowboy were detailed to found the Pueblo de San Jose de Guadalupe, named in honor of Saint Joseph. The already existing Spanish Catholic missions were not pleased with this, but could do nothing to stop it. By 1825, Mission Santa Clara offered rest for the travelers from Monterey and San Francisco. Although Mexico broke with the Spanish crown in 1821, it was not until May 10, 1825, that San Jose acknowledged Mexican rule. The Mexican government soon began selling off church lands in a process known as "secularization." Although originally intended to return church lands to the native population, this practice soon entailed a selling of church lands to the highest bidders. By 1839 only 300 Indians remained at the Mission Santa Clara. The time of the Californios, the rural land owning gentlemen, was short lived in California, however. American immigrants began arriving in California, followed by the Mexican–American War.

== Transition to U.S. territory ==
On May 13, 1846, the United States declared war on Mexico. Captain Thomas Fallon, leading 19 men, entered San Jose on July 14, 1846, and raised the United States flag over the town hall. San Jose consisted of a small town of Spanish Californians, Mexicans, Peruvians, Chileans, and Indians. After the completion of the Mexican–American War, in 1848, California, along with most of the western states, was added to the United States, first as a territory, but later as a state on September 9, 1850. In addition to the change of government, the California Gold Rush altered Santa Clara's political landscape. Suddenly swarms of immigrants arrived in California, looking to strike quick fortunes. The Gold Rush changed San Jose, which became a supply city for the numerous miners arriving in California. Many residents, alarmed by the arrival of so many Americans into the valley, fled to Mission Santa Clara. The Catholic bishop of California took an interest in the location, and by 1851 the Jesuits had set up the first college in the new state: Santa Clara University, on the rebuilt site of the old mission.

San Jose became the first capital of the state of California and the first California State Legislature convened there on December 15, 1849. Santa Clara County was one of the original counties of California, formed at the time of statehood. Other towns began to spring up in Santa Clara County after the gold rush. In 1852 Santa Clara became a town with duly elected trustees. The city of Mountain View is reported to have received its name when Jacob Shumway, a storekeeper, looked across the valley eastward and poetically named the place where he was standing "Mountain View." In September 1855 a small town, originally named McCarthysville, but later named Saratoga, came into existence 12 miles (19 km) west of San Jose at the base of the Santa Cruz Mountains. Saratoga became famous for its wine and spa, while Cupertino, which possessed a post office by 1882 and named after the original Spanish name for Stevens Creek, Arroyo de San Josè Cupertino, was famous for horse breeding. Los Gatos was formed from land originally owned by the British vice-consul to Mexican California, James Alexander Forbes. When Forbes went bankrupt, many pioneer lumbermen came down to the banks of Los Gatos creek and established the nucleus of the town. Gilroy, in the southern part of the county, was named after Scottish settler John Gilroy, who wed Maria Clara, granddaughter of the man who claimed San Francisco for Spain in 1769.

In 1849 Martin Murphy, Jr. controlled six of Santa Clara's largest ranchos. After Murphy's death real estate developer W. E. Crossman purchased 200 acres (0.81 km^{2}) of orchard land, which eventually became Sunnyvale in 1901. Palo Alto's original townsite was laid out in 1888 from land owned by Rafael Soto. It was here in the 1890s that California Senator Leland Stanford established the Leland Stanford Junior University in Palo Alto. The railroads soon followed the establishment of Palo Alto and the university. Paul Shoup, a Southern Pacific executive, spotted a good site for a township and organized the Altos Land Company. By 1908, the railroad began service and Los Altos filled up with buyers.

=== Economic growth ===
Santa Clara County was linked to the world by the railroads and agricultural success in the Santa Clara Valley was fostered by access to distant markets that the railroad made possible. This, combined with the discovery that artesian well water underlay the whole valley, created the conditions for the sudden wealth to be found in the agricultural business. Santa Clara County was soon producing carrots, almonds, tomatoes, prunes, apricots, plums, walnuts, cherries, and pears for the world market. With the establishment of seed farms in the last half of the 1870s, a new aspect of the agricultural business began. The Ferry-Morse Seed Company, founded by Charles Copeland Morse, became the world's largest flower and vegetable seed producer.

Santa Clara Valley was also experimenting with other sources of income. Oil wells once dotted the valley, and from 1866 until the discovery of other sources in 1880, the county produced nearly all of California's oil. Lumber also played a part in the county's economy; the town of Santa Clara saw the Pacific Manufacturing Company producing such items as Cyclone windmills and coffins. This company eventually became the largest manufacturer of wood products on the West Coast. Several wineries, such as the Picchetti Brothers Winery and the Paul Masson Mountain Winery were operating, and the area southwest of Cupertino was a winemaking region for years. Santa Clara County, with its farms, orchards and ranches remained largely rural and agricultural until after World War II.

By 1939 San Jose, with a population of 57,651, was the largest canning and dried-fruit packing center in the world, with 18 canneries, 13 dried-fruit packing houses, and 12 fresh-fruit and vegetable shipping firms. San Jose also served as a distribution point for the prune and apricot industry. Already, however, new technologies were developing—San Jose was one of the first California cities to create industries for making all the mechanical equipment for specialized farming.

== Industrialization ==
With the establishment of Stanford University, the changes were beginning which would create Silicon Valley. Palo Alto became, in the early twentieth century, a testing ground for radio equipment, and later the locale for development of continuous-wave transmission powered by arc converters, largely the work of Cyril Frank Elwell. Elwell employed a radio research team that included Lee De Forest, who had invented a three-element vacuum tube in New York. In 1912 this team discovered that the tube could be rigged as an amplifier, which was a major breakthrough for long distance telephone and radio use. Later radar, television and computer systems would benefit from this discovery. By 1912 San Jose was receiving the first regularly scheduled radio broadcasts. Palo Alto was a technical beacon. It was here that the Federal Telegraph Company, created by Elwell, created ocean-spanning networks, which supplied US Naval communications during World War I.

Already in the 1930s the US military saw the strategic advantages of Santa Clara Valley. Admiral William A. Moffett, appointed by President Warren G. Harding on July 25, 1924, as the first Chief of the Naval Bureau of Aeronautics, believed a naval aviation presence on the West Coast necessary for the nation's security. In the 1920s Moffett was fascinated with the lighter than air technology of the dirigibles. Northern California politicians, realizing the opportunities to be created, seized the initiative from San Diego, California, and money was found to purchase the 1,750 acres (7.1 km^{2}) of what would become Moffett Federal Airfield. Two Naval Air Stations were commissioned in the early 1930s to port the two US dirigibles. Hangar #1, built in 1932 and designed to house the USS Macon, remains one of the two largest structures in the United States without internal support. The military presence in the Bay Area in Northern California increased during World War II. On August 9, 1945, the same day the press recorded the second atomic bomb, dropped on Nagasaki, Japan, the San Jose Mercury Herald ran a front-page article under the headline Building Code Aims Listed which stated: "At least 60 percent of the county's wartime influx of people is expected to remain after hostilities cease, giving the county an estimated 210,000 population."

The growth of post World War II suburban development in the valley caused the disappearance of the orchards. Sunnyvale, which in 1939 was described as "a quiet ranchers' trade center," with a population of 3,094, grew to a suburb with a population of over 107,229 by 1990, with a population rise of 10% in one decade (1980–1990). Santa Clara County was, by 2000, home to 1,682,585 and still growing. Santa Clara (1939 population 6,303), Mountain View (1939 population 3,308) and other Santa Clara County cities also grew to many times their 1939 population size. However, vestiges of the old orchards remained, throughout the county, and as late as 1970 San Jose was still classified as partly rural by the United States Census, although the city had a population of 443,950. By 1990 San Jose's population reached 782,248 people, according to the census, and was the 11th most populated city in the nation, surpassing San Francisco in population.

Santa Clara County's growing suburbs can be tied to nationwide trends. The advent of the automobile and larger freeways and highways helped in the creation of suburbs. By the 1920s a cultural reaction against Victorian architecture and the creation of the affordable bungalow also helped this trend, as the middle class could afford homes outside the cities. Already in the 1920s, suburban areas were growing at a faster rate than central cities and after World War II, the suburban population exploded nationwide. During the 1940s, core cities grew by an average of 14 percent while the suburbs grew by 36 percent. Returning World War II veterans, getting married and settling down produced a baby boom unprecedented in American history. Already by 1960 more metropolitan residents lived in the suburbs than in the central city, and by 1990 the majority of all Americans lived in suburban areas. With the shift from an agricultural county to a large suburban one, Santa Clara County was following national trends. Its next move, with the creation of Silicon Valley, would lead national trends in creating the computer revolution, which would sweep the nation and the world.

== Growth of Silicon Valley ==
There are numerous reasons why Silicon Valley came into being. The early collaboration between Stanford professors and nearby industry aided the process. The increasing military presence, which began just before World War II, also contributed to this hi-tech corridor. Certainly America's defense spending during the Cold War Era, when research and development strove to keep abreast of the Soviet Union, helped. In response to Stanford University's financial problems around the mid-century, Professor Fred Terman of Stanford University's Department of Electrical Engineering leased parts of the university to high tech companies for 99 years, a move that is generally considered the start of the computer revolution in Santa Clara County.

In 1953, William Shockley left Bell Labs in a disagreement over the handling of the invention of the transistor. After returning to California Institute of Technology for a short while, in 1956 Shockley moved to Mountain View, California, and created Shockley Semiconductor Laboratory. Unlike many other researchers who used germanium as the semiconductor material, Shockley believed that silicon was the better material for making transistors. Shockley intended to replace the current transistor with a new three-element design (today known as the Shockley diode), but the design was considerably more difficult to build than the "simple" transistor. In 1957, Shockley decided to end research on the silicon transistor. As a result, the "traitorous eight" engineers left the company to form Fairchild Semiconductor. Two of the original employees of Fairchild Semiconductor, Robert Noyce and Gordon Moore, would go on to found Intel. In 1971, Intel created the first microprocessor, the Intel 4004. The next step in the Silicon Valley revolution occurred in March 1975, when the Homebrew Computer Club in Menlo Park was created by students with an interest in technology and a desire to experiment with building home computers. Steve Wozniak, a founding member, built a home computer from a cheap microprocessor, and showed it to his fellow club members, who included his friend Steve Jobs. Together, in Steve Jobs' garage in Cupertino, Wozniak and Jobs formed Apple Computer. By 1976 Apple's first personal computer, the Apple I, was being sold.

Even after the collapse of the dot-com bubble in the early 2000s, "about 4,000 IT-related companies located along Highway 101 from San Francisco to San Jose generate approximately $200 billion in IT-related revenue annually" reported Gregory R. Gromov, in The Roads and Crossroads of Internet History. Other technical advances also occurred in the field of biotechnology, a new industry, springing from discoveries of gene splicing and gene cloning at the Bay Area universities. The local four-year colleges and two-year community colleges met the demands for supplying high technology companies with engineers. San Jose State University leads the field in supplying these industries with more engineering graduates than all other colleges combined.

Overall, Santa Clara County's scientific/commercial renaissance has, with justification, been compared to the earlier European Renaissance. The creation of lasers, nuclear magnetic resonance, random access computer storage, disk drives, integrated circuits, personal computers, open-heart surgery, inkjet printers, gene-splicing and other advances in such a short span of time has placed Santa Clara County firmly in history as a unique location whose creative energies have changed the world. More recently, intensifying droughts in California have further strained Santa Clara County's water security.

== Bibliography and further reading ==
- Hall, Frederic (1871). The History of San José and Surroundings: With Biographical Sketches of Early Settlers. San Francisco, California: A.L. Bancroft and Company.
- Foote, Horace S. (1888). Pen Pictures from the Garden of the World, Or Santa Clara County, California. Santa Clara County, California: Lewis Publishing Company. pp. 1–672.
- Munro-Fraser, J. P. (1881). History of Santa Clara County, California: Including Its Geography, Geology, Topography, Climatography and Description ... Alley, Bowen, & Company.
- Sawyer, Eugene T. (1922). History of Santa Clara County California with Biographical Sketches of the Leading Men and Women of the County ... Los Angeles, California: Historic Record Company. pp. 1-1934.
