= Bill Bivens (announcer) =

American radio announcer (1915–1984)

William Clyde Bivens (March 24, 1915 - January 15, 1984) was an American radio announcer.

== Early years ==
Born in Gastonia, North Carolina, Bivens was the son of Mr. and Mrs. W. C. Bivens. He grew up in Lowell, North Carolina, and Charlotte, North Carolina. His mother managed the cafeteria at Gastonia High School. When he was 13 years old, he was the youngest Eagle Scout in the Piedmont Council. He operated a ham radio station and earned money for his hobbies by mowing lawns and working in a grocery store.

== Career ==
Bivens began his career in radio in 1928, when he was a teenager known as "Baby Bill", working after school and on weekends at WRBU in Gastonia. For his $4-per-week salary he worked from 4 to 10 p.m., when the station went off the air. He began each day's shift with a stop at a music store, usually picking up approximately 50 78 rpm records and taking them to the station. On Sundays he swept out the studio while a church service was broadcast. The Great Depression brought a reduction in pay to $3 per week.

In 1932, he left that station to join the staff of WFBC in Greenville, South Carolina, when it began broadcasting. At the end of 1934, he moved from WFBC to work at WJSV, the CBS affiliate in Washington, D. C. After a week's orientation he officially joined the WJSV staff on January 8, 1935, replacing Robert Trout. An article in The Greenville News when he announced his departure from WFBC called the move "a distinct promotion for Bivens, a deserved one ...". He rejoined the staff of WFBC in March 1936, after that station increased its power and became affiliated with NBC. From 1937 to 1941 he worked at WBT in Charlotte.

He went from Charlotte to New York City, where he was a network announcer for programs that included the Vox Pop interview program, The Fred Waring Show, and The Harry James Show. His first appearance on Vox Pop came unexpectedly when he had to fill in for the regular announcer, who became sick just before the show went on the air. His work was good enough that he was hired as the announcer. He also bought prizes, selected participants, and worked as advance man in addition to announcing. He began working for Waring on March 24, 1942. That role included announcing for morning shows Monday-Friday of each week and a broadcast on Monday evenings. Each 30-minute broadcast was preceded by about three hours of rehearsal. In addition to his duties as Waring's announcer he warmed up the audience by telling jokes before each broadcast began and he wrote and acted in parodies of soap operas on the show. Joining the James program required him to move to California, interrupting his work on the Waring shows. He was on Waring's show for nine years and on Kate Smith's program for four years. He spent one year on the James show and a year on each of the James Melton and Dorsey brothers programs.

Bivens also worked as a newsman in Washington, D. C., where he "covered everything from the birth of a chicken to the birth of a baby". That job kept him on call all of the time, especially when something newsworthy occurred on Capitol Hill. When he interviewed Representative Sol Bloom at the top of the Washington Monument, he became the first man to broadcast from that location. His work in Washington included covering President Franklin D. Roosevelt's fireside chats, which Bivens said amounted to little more than introducing the president. Another of Bivens's duties was being the stand-by replacement for Arthur Godfrey on his radio program, which originated from Washington. "We were never sure when he would come in for work," Bivens said, "so if he didn't show up I went on for him."

In 1954 Bivens and his father-in-law, Coit Robinson, were unsuccessful in attempting to put a television station in Gastonia. Robinson obtained a construction permit for a station, but diminishing funds and inability to "make connections with a suitable network" made the possibility of proceeding unlikely. In July 1954 Robinson said that the DuMont Television Network was available, but it was going to merge with ABC. That network's affiliation with a station in Charlotte made it unavailable to a station in Gastonia. Bivens was said to be in New York attempting to sell the permit.

In October 1964 Bivens became sales manager for radio stations WIST and WIST-FM in Charlotte. In 1965 he began working at WBT-FM in Charlotte, introducing the live stereo disc jockey programming format to listeners of that station. He was on the air live for four hours and 45 minutes each evening, Monday - Friday, with another recorded hour thrown in to give himself a break. His approach on the Stereo Serenade program was to use a conversational style, as if visiting in a person's home rather than speaking to a large group.

A heart condition caused him to retire in 1968. He remained in Charlotte "in a house cluttered with mementoes of his career", but he occasionally did some freelance work. He helped with the creation of the TV News Center at Central Piedmont Community College in 1973 and was the center's director.

== Personal life and death ==
In 1937, Bivens married the former Marjorie Robinson. They had three children. He died of a heart attack on January 15, 1984.
