= Richard Bivens =

American musician

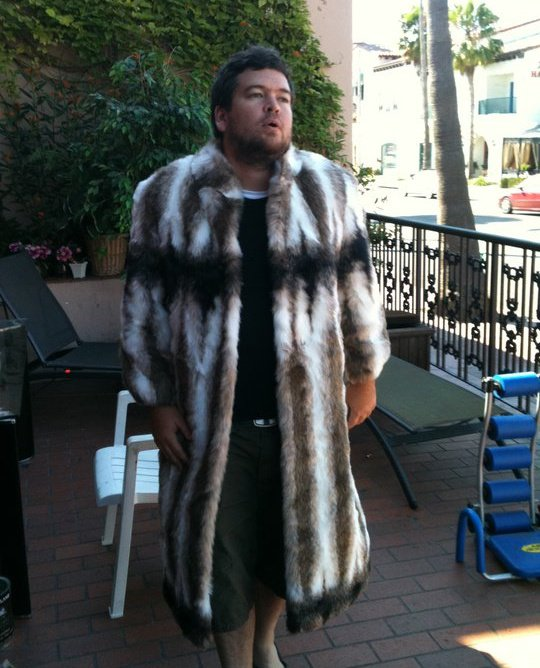
- Bivens at a press event (2010)

Background information
- Also known as: Bivens
- Born: Richard Bivens; August 26, 1979 (age 46); Downey, California
- Origin: Santa Ana, California
- Genres: Indie Rock, R&B
- Instruments: Guitar, Vocals, Keyboard
- Years active: 2006–Present
- Labels: Campaign Set, Circus Disco

Richard Bivens (born August 26, 1979) is an American musician from Orange County, California. He has performed as a solo artist and has been the frontman for Richard Bivens & Foreign Press, Regrets and Brunettes and Grief Thief. He currently resides in Oakland, California.

== Early life ==
Richard began writing songs at the age of 10, mostly of the R&B and hip-hop variety. His focus began to narrow in on rock music as he got older, and at the age of 15 he taught himself how to play guitar. He developed a unique style of playing a right handed guitar upside down and for the majority of his early career strummed without a pick.

As a child, Bivens was strongly considered for the lead role in the 1993 film Free Willy. He also appeared on an episode of VH1's Rock and Roll Jeopardy! at the age of 21, and became the show's youngest winner ever.

== Richard Bivens & Foreign Press ==
Consisting of high school friend Robert Pavlovich on bass guitar, Ali Ghanavat on rhythm guitar, and Dylan Kato on drums, Bivens formed Richard Bivens & Foreign Press, with the band recording their sole album Absolute Beginners in San Francisco, CA at Lucky Cat Recordings with producer Tony Leong. The album, consisting of 7 tracks and recorded on analog tape, was released in May 2006.

The band played several gigs in and around the Orange County, Los Angeles, and San Diego area until breaking up in late 2007.

== Regrets and Brunettes ==
After Foreign Press, Bivens began to work on new material in early 2008. He rehearsed the songs with Pavlovich and Kato and from there realized that he wanted to start up another project. The trio settled on the band name Regrets and Brunettes and swiftly entered themselves back in the local live music scene. For the first few shows, the band auditioned a plethora of musicians (including keyboardists) before rounding out their lineup with guitarist Anthony Chu in the Spring of 2008. With Chu, the band took their songwriting and musicianship to a new level.

=== At Night You Love Me ===
With this new lineup, Bivens and company spent nearly 12 months in their rehearsal space called the Rec Room in Anaheim, CA recording new material. The result was the 2009 album entitled At Night You Love Me (the name came from Bivens' love-hate relationship with a traffic light near his apartment) released on Campaign Set Records. ANYLM was well received by local and foreign critics alike. Whereas Absolute Beginners was more raw and warmer sounding, the band took their time to craft each song with ambient guitar and keyboard parts and more detailed arrangements. The album certainly fit the indie-rock mold, but its hard to deny the older and more pop-driven influences of Neil Young, Spoon, Pavement, and Big Star - all artists that Bivens idolized throughout his career.

=== Breakup ===
Although the band achieved mild success with the album and played shows with the likes of Delta Spirit, The Henry Clay People, and Pepper Rabbit they found it hard to balance lives as musicians and lives as professionals. Pavlovich gained more responsibility becoming a father and Chu became a full-time medical student. The difficulties in scheduling time for the band caused enough friction that the band broke up officially in August 2010. They posthumously released their final song called "Facts & Figures."

== Solo career ==
After Bivens formed Regrets and Brunettes, guitarist Ali Ghanavat decided to reset Foreign Press, without Bivens on vocals. He recruited singer Juanita Mankuleiyo (who performed backup vocals on Absolute Beginners), bassist and childhood friend Jeff Basin, as well as Foreign Press's original drummer Richard Rizk. Foreign Press revitalizes songs that Bivens has written over the past decade, as well as performing new songs written specifically for this new incarnation of the band. In 2013, Foreign Press released their self-titled debut, consisting of 13 songs each written by Bivens.

=== Grief Thief ===
Bivens relocated to Oakland, California in 2012 to begin work on his debut solo album with Absolute Beginners producer Tony Leong. Over the next couple of years, dozens of tracks were recorded with an assorted cast of Bay Area musicians, including members of The Matches, Facing New York, Con Brio, Tumbleweed Wanderers and The Soft White Sixties. Although more than an album's worth of material was compiled, Bivens and Leong scrapped many of the recordings and left others to die in their infancy.

In 2016, Bivens restarted the project with Leong under the artist name Grief Thief. Joined by Jeremy Lyon (lead guitar), Zak Mandel-Romann (bass), Patrick Monaco Glynn (keys) and Omar Cuellar (drums), their efforts culminated in the 2017 EP release of Laugh Tracks.
