= Index of California-related articles =

The location of the state of California in the United States of America

The following is an alphabetical list of articles related to the U.S. state of California.

== 0–9 ==
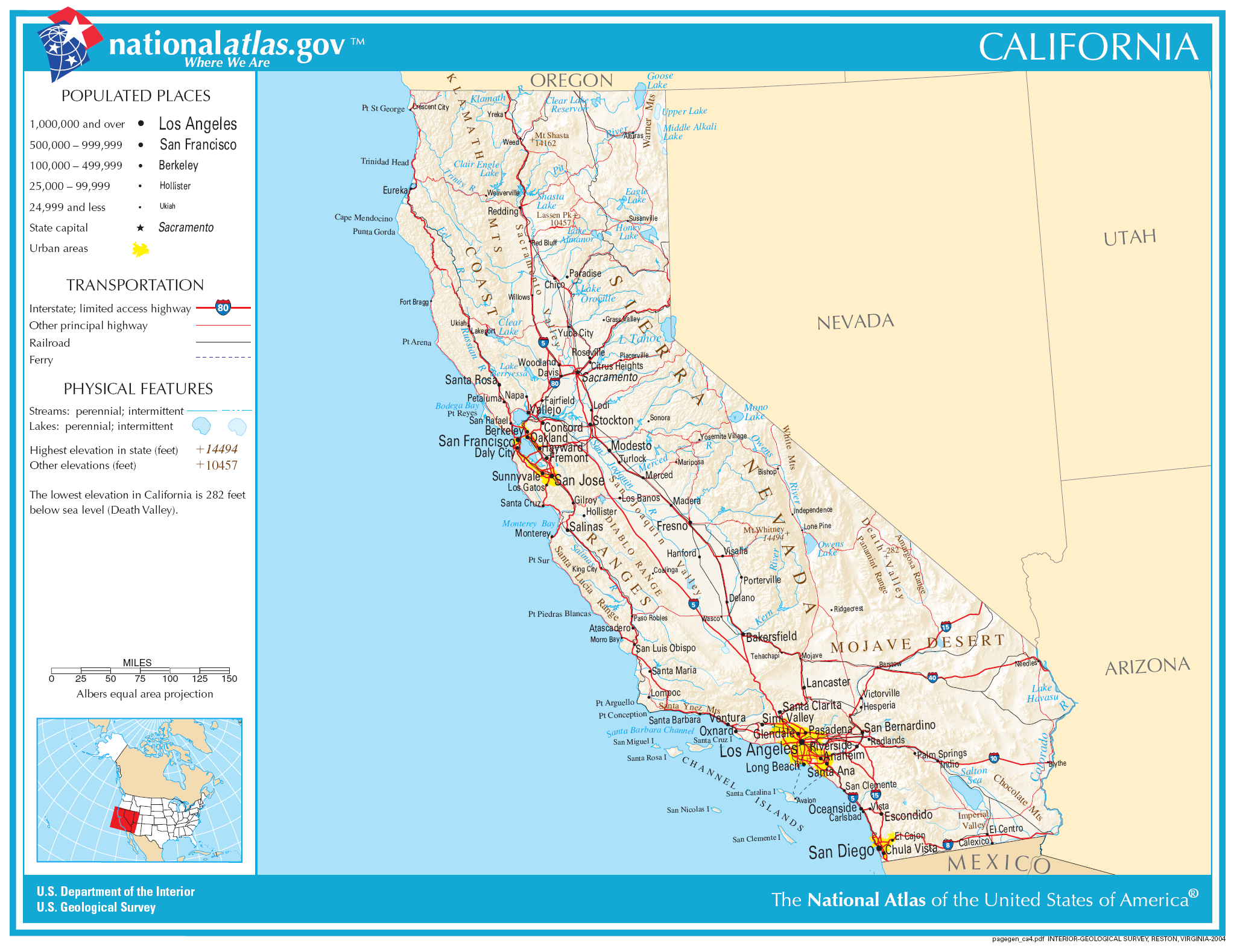
An enlargeable map of the state of California

- .ca.us – Internet second-level domain for the state of California
- 33rd parallel north
- 34th parallel north
- 35th parallel north
- 36th parallel north
- 37th parallel north
- 38th parallel north
- 39th parallel north
- 40th parallel north
- 41st parallel north
- 42nd parallel north
- 100 km isolated peaks of California
- 115th meridian west
- 116th meridian west
- 117th meridian west
- 118th meridian west
- 119th meridian west
- 120th meridian west
- 121st meridian west
- 122nd meridian west
- 123rd meridian west
- 124th meridian west
- 1500 meter prominent peaks of California
- 4000 meter peaks of California
- 14,000-foot peaks of California

== A ==
- Abortion in California
- Adjacent states:
  - State of Baja California
  - State of Arizona
  - State of Nevada
  - State of Oregon
- ACEC California
- Agriculture in California
- Airports in California
- Alta California, 1804–1846
- Amusement parks in California
- An Act for the Admission of the State of California
- Category:Aquaria in California
- Category:Arboreta in California
  - commons:Category:Arboreta in California
- Archaeology of California
  - Category:Archaeological sites in California
    - commons:Category:Archaeological sites in California
- Architecture of California
  - Architecture of the California missions
- Art museums and galleries in California
  - commons:Category:Art museums and galleries in California
- Area codes in California
- Astronomical observatories in California
  - commons:Category:Astronomical observatories in California
- Attorney General of the State of California

== B ==
- Bay Area Coalition for Equitable Schools
- Beaches of California
  - commons:Category:Beaches of California
- Benicia, California, state capital 1853–1854
- Bernstein's Fish Grotto
- Botanical gardens in California
  - commons:Category:Botanical gardens in California
- budget crisis, California
- Buildings and structures in California
  - commons:Category:Buildings and structures in California
- Bibliography of California history

== C ==
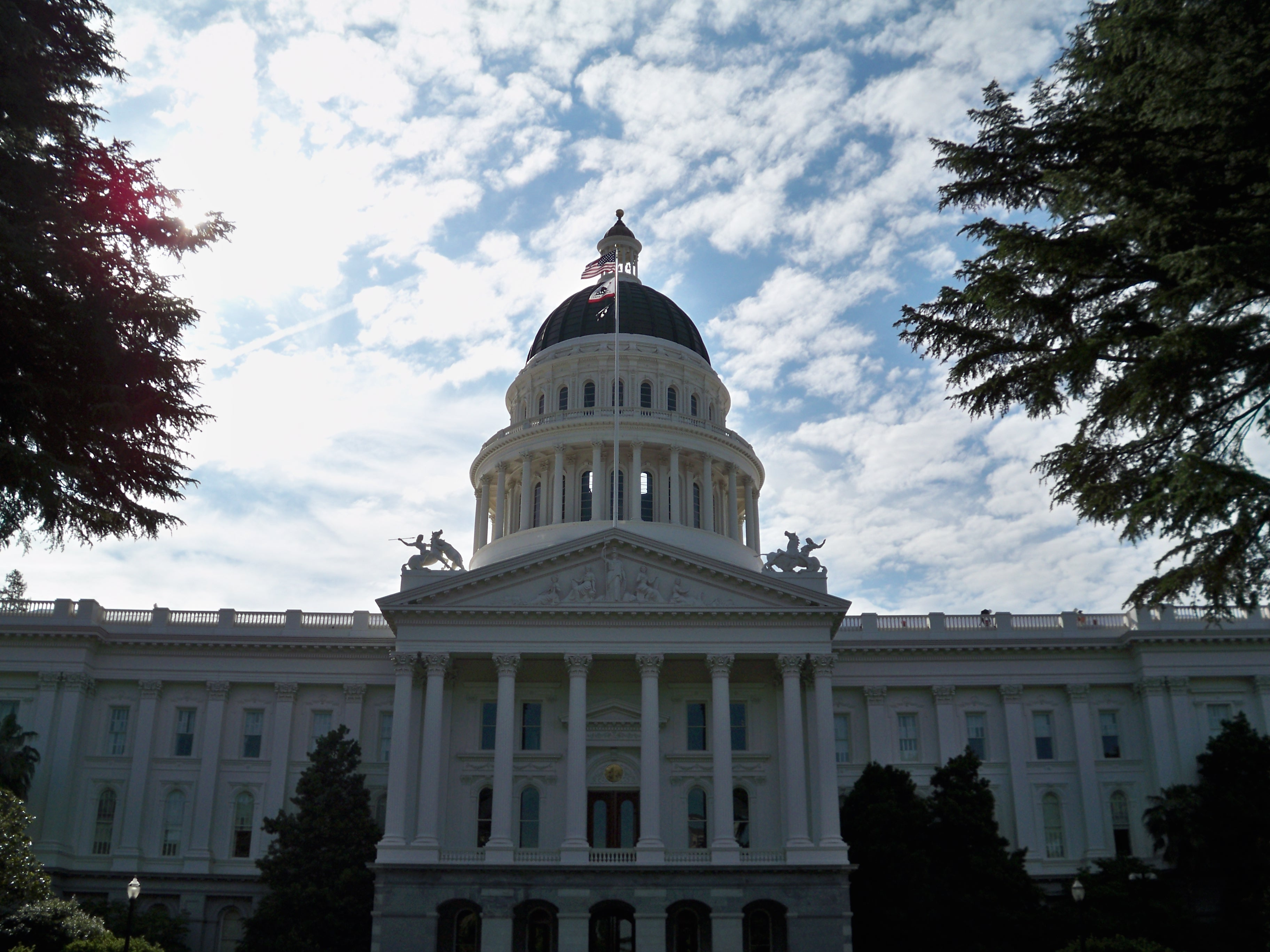
The California State Capitol in Sacramento

- CA – United States Postal Service postal code for the state of California
- California website
  - Category:California
    - commons:Category:California
      - commons:Category:Maps of California
- California Alpine Club
- California Autism Foundation
- California Border Police Initiative
- California Children's Services
- California Complete Count Committee
- California English
- California Fair Pay Act
- California Festival of Beers
- California Firearm Violence Research Center
- California flood of 1605
- California Gold Rush, 1848–1855
- California in the American Civil War, 1861–1865
- California Latino Leadership Fund
- California locations by per capita income
- California Low Cost Auto Insurance Program
- California Military Institute
- California mission project
- California National University for Advanced Studies
- California Northern Magazine
- California Outside Music Association
- California Proposition 18 (1958)
- California Reading List
- California Rehabilitation Institute
- California Senate Bill 535 (2012)
- California Social Security Fairness Act of 2013
- California State Employees Association
- California State Retirees
- California Supplemental Exam
- California Trail, 1848–1869
- California University of Business and Technology
- The California Wine Club
- Cannabis in California
- Capital of the State of California
- Capitol of the State of California
  - commons:Category:California State Capitol
- Casinos in California
- Caves of California
  - commons:Category:Caves of California
- Census statistical areas of California
- Central Coast of California
- Central Valley of California
- Cities in California
  - commons:Category:Cities in California
- Climate of California
- Climate change in California
- Colleges and universities in California
  - commons:Category:Universities and colleges in California
- Communications in California
  - commons:Category:Communications in California
- Colorado River

An enlargeable map of the 58 counties of the state of California

- Companies in California
  - Category:Companies based in California
- Congressional districts of California
- Constitution of the State of California
- Convention centers in California
  - commons:Category:Convention centers in California
- Counties of the state of California
  - commons:Category:Counties in California
- County highway routes in California
- Crime in California
- Cuisine of California
  - California cuisine
- Culture of California
  - Category:Culture of California
    - commons:Category:California culture

== D ==
- Death Valley
- Demographics of California
  - Category:Demographics of California
- Domestic partnership in California

== E ==
- Ecology of California
- Economy of California
  - Category:Economy of California
    - commons:Category:Economy of California
- Education in California
  - Category:Education in California
    - commons:Category:Education in California
- El Camino Real
- El Pueblo de San José de Guadalupe, state capital 1850–1852
- Elections in the state of California
  - Category:Elections in California
    - commons:Category:Elections in California
- Energy in California
- Environment of California
  - commons:Category:Environment of California

== F ==
The flag of the state of California

- Festivals in California
  - commons:Category:Festivals in California
- Flag of the state of California
- Forts in California
  - Category:Forts in California
    - commons:Category:Forts in California
- Foster Park Bowl
- Metropolitan Fresno

== G ==
The Great Seal of the State of California

- Gambling in California
- Gardens in California
  - commons:Category:Gardens in California
- Geography of California
  - Category:Geography of California
    - commons:Category:Geography of California
- Geology of California
  - commons:Category:Geology of California
- Ghost towns in California
  - Category:Ghost towns in California
    - commons:Category:Ghost towns in California
- Gold mining in California
- Golf clubs and courses in California
- Government of the state of California website
  - Category:Government of California
    - commons:Category:Government of California
- Governor of the State of California
  - List of governors of California
- Great Seal of the State of California
- Gyro's 3D Fear Factory

== H ==
- Heritage railroads in California
  - commons:Category:Heritage railroads in California
- High schools of California
- Higher education in California
- Highest major peaks of California
- Highway routes in California
- Hiking trails in California
  - commons:Category:Hiking trails in California
- History of California
  - Historical outline of California
  - History of California wine
  - History of California bread
    - Category:History of California
      - commons:Category:History of California
- Healthcare in California
  - Hospitals in California

== I ==
- Images of California
  - commons:Category:California
- Inland Empire of Southern California
- Interstate highway routes in California

== J ==
- Johnson, John

== L ==
- Lakes in California
  - Category:Lakes of California
    - commons:Category:Lakes of California
- Landmarks in California
  - commons:Category:Landmarks in California
- Languages in California
- Law in California
- Lieutenant Governor of the State of California
- Lists related to the state of California:
  - List of airports in California
  - List of annual foot races in California
  - List of areas protected by the California Department of Fish and Game
  - List of ballot propositions in California
    - List of ballot propositions in California 1970–1979
  - List of birds in California
  - List of botanical gardens and arboretums in California
  - List of California wildfires
  - List of census statistical areas in California
  - List of cemeteries in California
  - List of cities, places, and neighborhoods in California
    - List of cities in California
      - List of cities in California by population
      - List of city nicknames in California
    - List of largest census-designated places in California
    - List of locations in California by per capita income
    - List of places in California
  - List of colleges and universities in California
  - List of companies based in California
  - List of counties in California
    - List of county name etymologies in California
    - List of county sheriffs in California
  - List of dams and reservoirs in California
  - List of district attorneys in California
  - List of forts in California
  - List of governors of California
  - List of high schools in California
  - List of highest points in California by county
  - List of highway routes in California
  - List of hospitals in California
  - List of individuals executed in California
  - List of Interstate highway routes in California
  - List of lakes in California
  - List of law enforcement agencies in California
  - List of lieutenant governors of California
  - List of mammals in California
  - List of mountain ranges of California
  - List of mountains of California
    - List of 4000 meter peaks of California
    - List of mountain peaks of California
  - List of mountain passes in California
  - List of movies set in Los Angeles
  - List of museums in California
  - List of National Historic Landmarks in California
  - List of newspapers in California
  - List of Ohlone villages
  - List of oldest schools in California
  - List of people associated with the California Gold Rush
  - List of people from California
  - List of power stations in California
  - List of pre-statehood governors of California
  - List of professional sports teams in California
  - List of protected areas within California
  - List of radio stations in California
  - List of railroads in California
  - List of regions of California
  - List of Registered Historic Places in California
  - List of reptiles in California
  - List of reservoirs and dams in California
  - List of rivers of California
  - List of school districts in California
    - List of school districts in California by county
  - List of Sierra Nevada topics
  - List of sister cities in California
  - List of speakers of the California State Assembly
  - List of state agencies in California
  - List of state beaches of California
  - List of state forests in California
  - List of state highways in California
  - List of state historic parks of California
  - List of state parks in California
  - List of state prisons in California
  - List of symbols of the state of California
  - List of telephone area codes in California
  - List of television shows set in Los Angeles
  - List of television shows set in San Francisco
  - List of television stations in California
  - List of California's congressional delegations
  - List of United States congressional districts in California
  - List of United States representatives from California
  - List of United States senators from California
  - List of urbanized areas in California by population
  - List of wine producing regions
- Los Angeles, California
- Greater Los Angeles
- Los Angeles-Long Beach-Santa Ana, CA Metropolitan Statistical Area

== M ==
  - commons:Category:Maps of California
- Maritime history of California
- Mass media in California
- Missionary Church of the Disciples of Jesus Christ
- Monterey, California, capital of California 1777–1804, capital of Alta California 1804–1846, capital of U.S. military government of California 1846–1849, capital of provisional government of California 1849–1850
- Monument House
- Monuments and memorials in California
  - commons:Category:Monuments and memorials in California
- Mountain peaks of California
  - The 25 Highest major peaks of California
    - The 16 4000 meter peaks of California
  - The 25 Most prominent peaks of California
    - The 9 Ultra prominent peaks of California
  - The 25 Most isolated major peaks of California
    - The 9 100 km isolated peaks of California
  - Category:Mountains of California
    - commons:Category:Mountains of California
- Museums in California
  - Category:Museums in California
    - commons:Category:Museums in California
- Music of California
  - commons:Category:Music of California
  - Category:Musical groups from California
  - Category:Musicians from California

== N ==
- National forests of California
  - commons:Category:National Forests of California
- Native Daughters of the Golden West
- Native Sons of the Golden West
- Natural gas pipelines in California
- Natural history of California
  - commons:Category:Natural history of California
- Nature centers in California
  - commons:Category:Nature centers in California
- NatureBridge
- Newspapers of California
- Northern California
- Nueva California

== O ==
- Outdoor sculptures in California
  - commons:Category:Outdoor sculptures in California
- Outline of California

== P ==
- People from California
  - Category:People from California
    - commons:Category:People from California
    - Category:People from California by populated place
- Places in California
- Politics of California
  - Category:Politics of California
    - commons:Category:Politics of California
- Presidio Reál de San Carlos de Monterey, capital of Las Californias 1777–1804, capital of Alta California 1804–1846
- Professional sports teams in California
- Protected areas of California
  - Category:Protected areas of California
    - commons:Category:Protected areas of California

== Q ==
- Quinn, Isaac

== R ==
- Radio stations in California
- Rail transport in California since 1856
- Railroad museums in California
  - commons:Category:Railroad museums in California
- Railroads in California
- Ranchos of California
- Registered historic places in California
  - commons:Category:Registered Historic Places in California
- Religion in California
  - Category:Religion in California
    - commons:Category:Religion in California
- Renewable energy in California
- Repopulation of wolves in California
- Rivers of California
  - commons:Category:Rivers of California
- Riverside, California
- Riverside-San Bernardino-Ontario, CA Metropolitan Statistical Area
- Rock formations in California
  - commons:Category:Rock formations in California
- Roller coasters in California
  - commons:Category:Roller coasters in California

== S ==
- Sacramento, California, state capital since 1854
- Sacramento metropolitan area
- Salton Sea
- Salton Trough
  - Salton Sink
- Same-sex marriage in California
- San Diego, California
- San Diego-Carlsbad-San Marcos, CA Metropolitan Statistical Area
- San Francisco, California
- San Francisco Bay Area
- San Jose, California, state capital 1850–1852
- Silicon Valley
- School districts of California
- Scouting in California
- Settlements in California
  - Cities in California
  - Census Designated Places in California
  - Other unincorporated communities in California
  - List of ghost towns in California
  - List of places in California
- Sister cities in California
- Ski areas and resorts in California
  - commons:Category:Ski areas and resorts in California
- Solar power in California
- Southern California
- Spanish missions in California
- Sports in California
  - List of professional sports teams in California
  - Category:Sports in California
    - commons:Category:Sports in California
  - Category:Sports venues in California
    - commons:Category:Sports venues in California
- State Assembly of California
- State Capitol of California
- State highway routes in California
- State of California website
  - Constitution of the State of California
  - Government of the State of California
    - Category:Government of California
      - commons:Category:Government of California
  - Executive branch of the government of the state of California
    - Governor of the State of California
  - Legislative branch of the government of the state of California
    - Legislature of the State of California
      - State Senate of California
      - State Assembly of California
  - Judicial branch of the government of the state of California
    - Supreme Court of the State of California
- State parks of California
  - commons:Category:State parks of California
- State prisons of California
- State Senate of California
- Statutes of California
- Structures in California
  - commons:Category:Buildings and structures in California
- Superfund sites in California
- Supreme Court of the State of California
- Symbols of the state of California
  - Category:Symbols of California
    - commons:Category:Symbols of California

== T ==
- Telecommunications in California
  - commons:Category:Communications in California
- Telephone area codes in California
- Television shows set in California
- Television stations in California
- The Californias, 1770–1804
- Theatres in California
  - commons:Category:Theatres in California
- Tourism in California website
  - commons:Category:Tourism in California
- Transportation in California
  - Category:Transportation in California
    - commons:Category:Transport in California
- Treaty of Guadalupe Hidalgo of 1848

== U ==
- Ultra prominent peaks of California
- United States of America
  - States of the United States of America
  - United States census statistical areas of California
  - California's congressional delegations
  - United States congressional districts in California
  - United States Court of Appeals for the Ninth Circuit
  - United States District Court for the Central District of California
  - United States District Court for the Eastern District of California
  - United States District Court for the Northern District of California
  - United States District Court for the Southern District of California
  - United States representatives from California
  - United States senators from California
- Universities and colleges in California
  - commons:Category:Universities and colleges in California
- US-CA – ISO 3166-2:US region code for the State of California
- USS California

== V ==
- Vallejo, California, state capital 1852–1853

== W ==
- Water parks in California
- Waterfalls of California
  - commons:Category:Waterfalls of California
  Wikimedia
  - Wikimedia Commons:Category:California
    - commons:Category:Maps of California
  - Wikinews:Category:California
    - Wikinews:Portal:California
  - Wikipedia Category:California
    - Wikipedia Portal:California
- Wind power in California

== X ==
- Xavier College Preparatory High School (California)

== Y ==
- Yuha Desert

== Z ==
- Zoos in California
  - commons:Category:Zoos in California

== See also ==
- Topic overview:
  - California
  - Outline of California
