= Golden City FC =

Men's soccer club in San Francisco, California

- Interim logo
- Founded: 2025
- Ground: Kezar Stadium; San Francisco, California
- Owners: Geoff Oltmans; Marc Rohrer
- League: MLS Next Pro (planned)
- Website: goldencityfootballclub.org

Golden City Football Club (GCFC) is an American professional soccer club based in San Francisco, California. Owned by a group led by co-founders Geoff Oltmans and Marc Rohrer, the club plans to commence play in MLS Next Pro, a men's Division 3 league in the United States league system, as early as the 2027 season. The team will play its home games at a renovated Kezar Stadium, and will be one of five professional soccer clubs based in the San Francisco Bay Area.

Following its foundation by Oltmans and Rohrer in 2025, Golden City's debut was promoted by the mayor of San Francisco, Daniel Lurie, who also assisted in procuring Kezar as a home ground for the club. Oltmans had previously donated to a nonprofit organization founded by Lurie. Despite opposition from San Francisco City FC, who would be displaced from Kezar, Golden City was granted a fifteen-year permit to play at the stadium by the San Francisco Board of Supervisors, contingent on the club investing $10 million into upgrades of its facilities.

== History ==
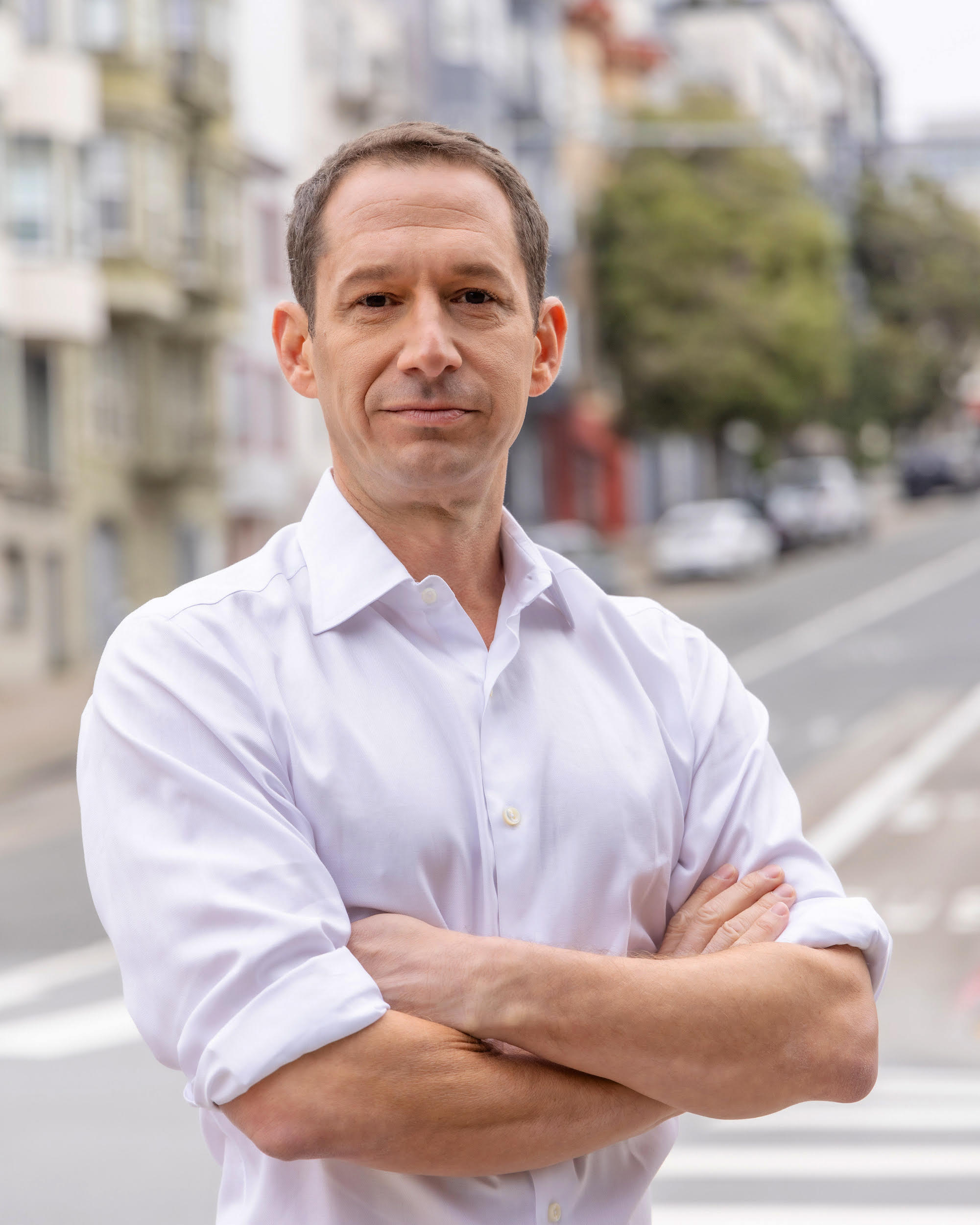
Daniel Lurie, the mayor of San Francisco, helped promote the club's debut, and assisted in securing a permit to play at Kezar Stadium.

Financial executives Geoff Oltmans of Silver Lake Partners and Marc Rohrer of Wells Fargo co-founded Golden City FC in 2025, and struck a public–private partnership with the Government of San Francisco to upgrade Kezar Stadium for use as its home ground. Oltmans and Rohrer previously played college soccer for the Dartmouth Big Green and Fresno State Bulldogs, respectively. In May 2025, the club's establishment was announced by the mayor of San Francisco, Daniel Lurie, through social media posts by the mayor's office, and interviews with local news media. Oltmans and Silver Lake Partners previously donated at least $152,000 and $275,500, respectively, to a nonprofit organization founded by Lurie. Following the announcement, legislation co-sponsored by Lurie and supervisor Bilal Mahmood was introduced to the San Francisco Board of Supervisors that grants the club a fifteen-year permit to play at Kezar, with options for up to three five-year extensions.

San Francisco City FC, the primary tenant at Kezar Stadium, was given two days' notice of the plans, and was offered "at least one game at Kezar [per season]—possibly more" by the San Francisco Recreation & Parks Department, which manages the stadium. San Francisco City FC and its supporters protested the proposed move to Boxer Stadium, describing the facility as subpar, and criticizing the plan as "rushed through with limited public input and favor[ing] private interests at the expense of longstanding local organizations". El Farolito SC and the San Francisco Nighthawks, who also play at Kezar, expressed similar concerns, though they hoped the plan could grow soccer in San Francisco and spur desired upgrades to other venues in the city. Despite this opposition, the Board of Supervisors unanimously approved the permit without discussion in June.

Golden City plans to commence play in MLS Next Pro, a men's Division 3 league in the United States soccer league system, as early as the 2027 season. Under the permit, the club has until the end of September 2027 to complete at least half of its planned upgrades to Kezar, though commencement of upgrade works was delayed from December 2025 to late 2026, which was disseminated in a "brief update" offered to SFGate in May 2026. The club otherwise went dark during this time, posting no content to social media and declining interviews—their website was also offline throughout early 2026.

== Organization ==
Golden City's ownership group includes its co-founders, Geoff Oltmans and Marc Rohrer. Neither the club's full board of owners nor its funding sources have been publicly revealed, though Oltmans has stated it aims to have as many as twelve San Francisco Bay Area-based investors in the club's ownership group.

== Stadium ==
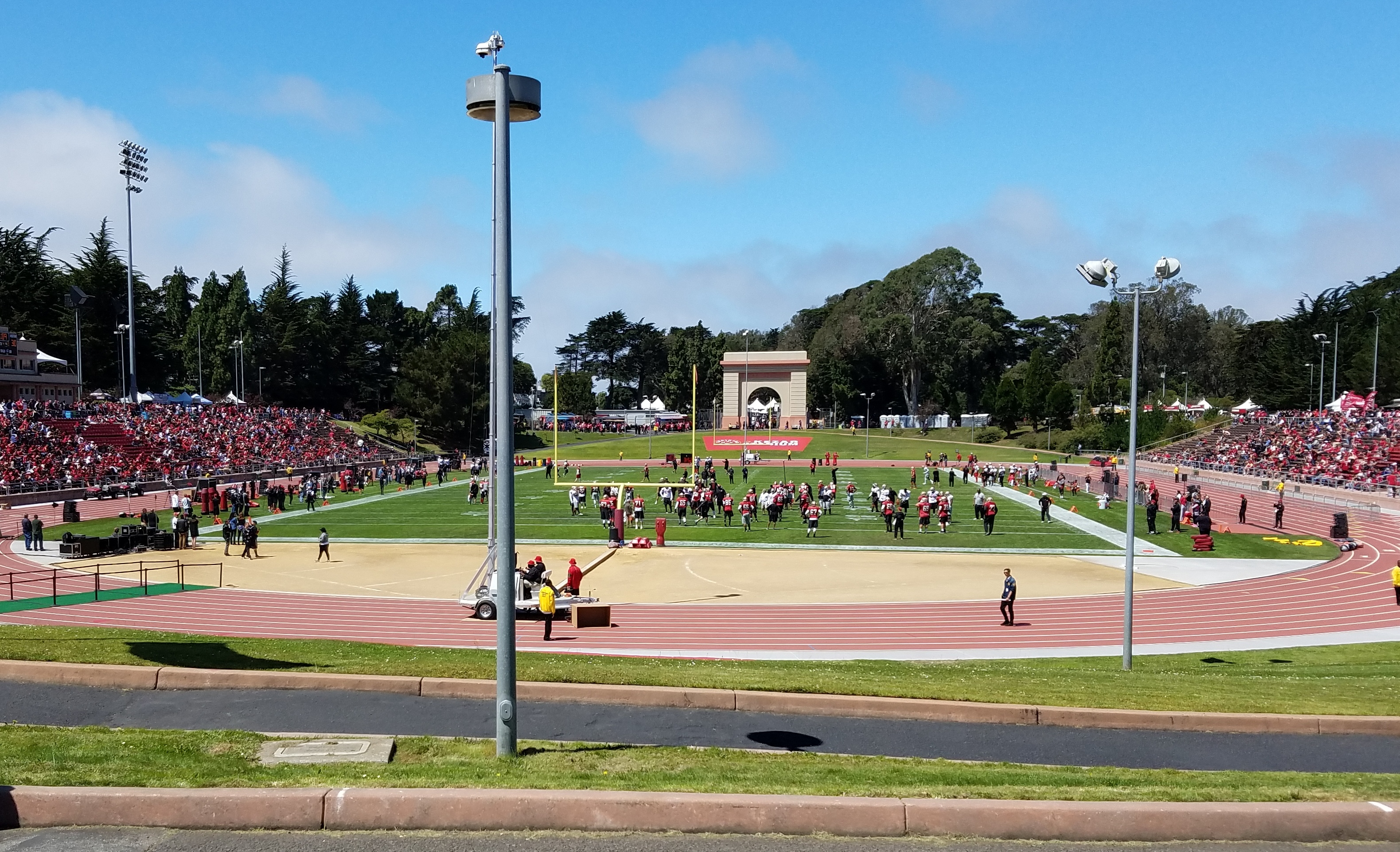
The club plans to renovate Kezar Stadium (pictured) for its home games.

Golden City plans to play its home games at the municipally owned Kezar Stadium in Golden Gate Park, adjacent to the Haight-Ashbury district. The stadium is the home of supporter-owned amateur club San Francisco City FC, and was the home of two now-defunct professional clubs: the California Victory and San Francisco Deltas. The club's permit agreement with the city requires Golden City to invest $10 million in capital improvements, including a new natural grass field with irrigation sprinklers, accessibility infrastructure compliant with the Americans with Disabilities Act, and upgraded concession stands, press box, public address system, seating, and LED scoreboard.

== See also ==
- San Francisco Glens
- Olympic Club
- San Francisco Soccer Football League
- List of professional sports teams in California
- List of soccer clubs in the United States
