= California Rehabilitation Institute =

Geography
- Location: 2070 Century Park East, Los Angeles, California, United States
- Coordinates: 34.059209°N 118.411777°W

Organization
- Type: Academic health science center
- Affiliated university: David Geffen School of Medicine at UCLA, Cedars-Sinai Medical Center

Services
- Emergency department: None
- Beds: 138 beds

History
- Founded: 2016

Links
- Website: californiarehabinstitute.com
- Lists: Hospitals in California

California Rehabilitation Institute is a physical medicine and rehabilitation hospital located in Century City, California. The hospital is a joint venture of UCLA and Cedars-Sinai Medical Center. The hospital opened in July 2016 and is being operated by Select Medical Corporation.

== US News and World Report Rankings ==
California Rehabilitation Institute was ranked 20th in the 2026 U.S. News & World Report annual ranking of hospitals.

== Leadership ==
Chief Executive Officer of California Rehabilitation Institute is Michelle Sullivan, P.T., DPT, MBA, FACHE.

Medical Director of the California Rehabilitation Institute is Dr. Christopher Boudakian.
