= Garen Wintemute =

Garen J. Wintemute is an emergency medicine physician at UC Davis Medical Center, in the US state of California, where he is the director of the Violence Prevention Research Program. He conducts research in the fields of injury epidemiology and the prevention of firearm violence. He has been named a "hero of medicine" by Time magazine. He is the director of the University of California Firearm Violence Research Center, which was established in 2017; the center is the first state-funded gun violence research center in the country. He was elected a Member of the National Academy of Medicine in 2024.

== Research ==
Wintemute is one of a few public health experts researching gun violence in the United States—he has said that there are only a dozen researchers in the United States who study this subject, including him. He has funded this research in part through more than $1 million of his own money. In 1987, he published a study on accidental gun deaths among children in California, of which 88 occurred between 1977 and 1983. The same study found that in about one-third of incidents, the shooter did not know the gun was loaded or real. At a press conference to announce the study's results, multiple real guns like those involved in the accidental deaths were placed next to toy lookalikes; few of the reporters in attendance could tell them apart. His research on Saturday night special handguns, especially a 1994 study he published entitled "Ring of Fire", has been credited as the main reason for the California government's efforts to impose strict regulations on them. In 2017 he has published a study showing that gun owners with an alcohol-related criminal conviction are more likely than gun owners without such a conviction to be arrested for a subsequent gun-related crime.
