= California Statehood Act =

Federal admission act to join California to the United States

- Other short titles: California Admissions Act
- Long title: An Act for the Admission of the State of California into the Union
- Enacted by: the 31st United States Congress
- Effective: September 9, 1850

Citations
- Public law: Pub. L. 31–49
- Statutes at Large: 9 Stat. 452

Legislative history
- Introduced in the Senate as S. 169; Passed the Senate on August 14, 1850 (34–18); Passed the House on September 7, 1850 (150–56); Signed into law by President Millard Fillmore on September 9, 1850

The California Statehood Act, officially An Act for the Admission of the State of California into the Union and also known as the California Admission Act, is the federal legislation that admitted California to the United States as the thirty-first state. Passed in 1850 by the 31st United States Congress, the law made California one of only a few states to become a state without first being part of an organized territory name.An Act for the Admission of the State of California into the Union was the formal title given to the Congressional legislation passed by the 31st Congress, and signed by President Millard Fillmore on September 9, 1850, which admitted California as the 31st state to the Union. Per the terms of the Compromise of 1850, California was admitted as a free state. The Act may informally be referred to as the California Statehood Act or the California Admission Act.

== Background ==
=== Start of Mexican–American War and Bear Flag Revolt ===
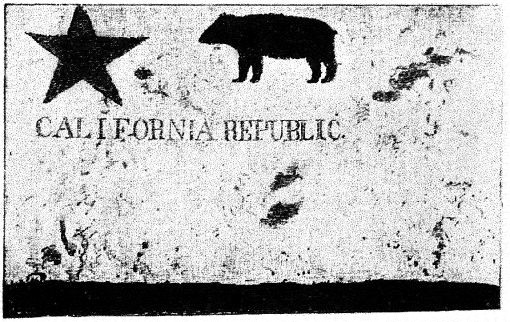
Todd's original Bear Flag, photographed in 1890

The United States declared war on Mexico on May 13, 1846. After receiving word of the declaration of war, a force consisting mostly of American settlers in California staged a revolt on June 15, 1846 against Mexican authorities, which became known at the Bear Flag Revolt. They overwhelmed and captured the small Mexican garrison at Sonoma and declared the California Republic (Spanish: La República de California), or Bear Flag Republic, raising the original Bear State flag over the captured garrison. (Note: The first version of the Bear State flag is named the Todd Bear flag. The designer was William L. Todd, a cousin of Mary Todd Lincoln. It was created using blackberry juice. In 1906 it was destroyed in the fires that followed the great San Francisco earthquake. A photograph exists of the flag from 1890, and a reproduction of the flag is on display in the Presidio de Sonoma museum.) Their control was largely restricted to the area around Sonoma, California and lasted for 25 days. On July 5, 1846, Brevet Captain John C. Frémont assumed control of the republic's forces and integrated them into his California Battalion. Fremont and his soldiers had not participated in the revolt, though he had given his tacit approval for it. On July 9, 1846, Navy Lieutenant Joseph Warren Revere arrived in Sonoma and replaced the Bear Flag with the flag of the United States, formally declaring the United States possession of California.

=== End of Mexican–American War ===
The Mexican–American War ended with the signing of the Treaty of Guadalupe Hidalgo in 1848. In the treaty, Mexico ceded a large portion of northern Mexico in what is now the southwestern United States. With the acquisition of the large territory, Congress began debating how to organize it. Initially, there was no cause to rush the organization, as the territory was sparsely populated. However, with the discovery of gold at Sutter's Mill, California, a large migration of Americans began, as well as an influx of new immigrants from Europe and Asia seeking to find gold or provide goods and services to those seeking gold. The migration gave rise to the immediate necessity of organizing the territory to provide services such as recording land deeds and claims, providing court services and law enforcement, and organizing local governments.

== Admission debate ==
The issue of the expansion or restriction of slavery was a fundamental dispute in the admission of new states to the Union since before the passage of the Missouri Compromise in 1820. The size of the California territory, its natural resources, access to the Pacific, and the speed at which the territory's population was expanding added a special urgency to organizing and admitting California into the Union. Some feared that if the United States did not act swiftly an independence movement could erupt that might sever California from the United States. A fierce debate raged over the status of California and the other territories ceded to the U.S. by Mexico for most of the 31st Congress. General Zachary Taylor, a hero of but also a staunch opponent of the Mexican War, had become President in March 1849. Although Taylor was a southern slaveowner, he believed that slavery was economically unfeasible in the acquired territories and therefore opposed the expansion of slavery as pointless and controversial, which became a serious obstacle impeding agreement in Congress on a solution to the territorial issue. In Taylor's 1849 State of the Union message to Congress, he commented extensively on the issue of California, stating in part,

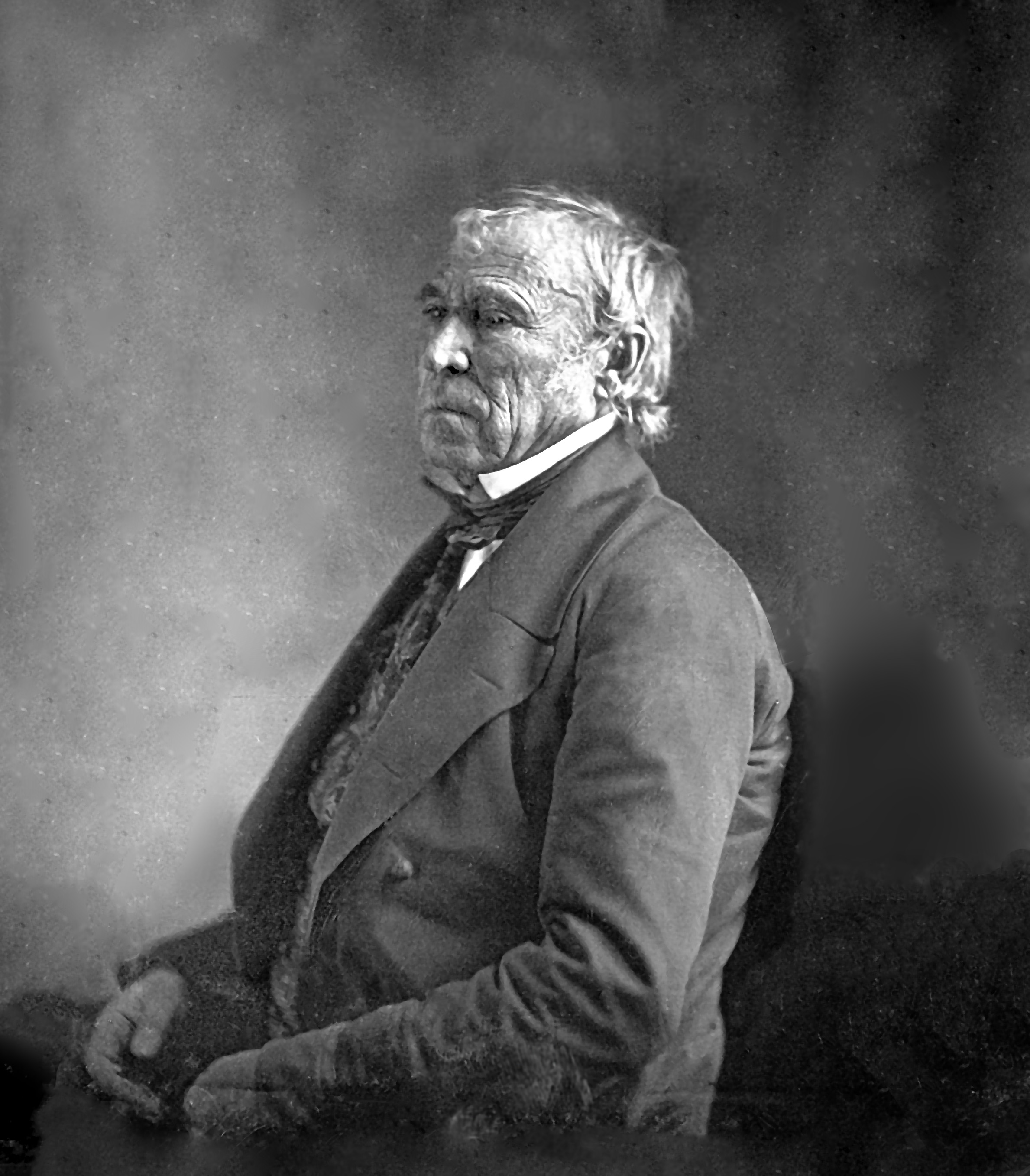
Zachary Taylor (1849)

The extension of the coast of the United States on the Pacific and the unexampled rapidity with which the inhabitants of California especially are increasing in numbers have imparted new consequence to our relations with the other countries whose territories border upon that ocean. It is probable that the intercourse between those countries and our possessions in that quarter, particularly with the Republic of Chili, will become extensive and mutually advantageous in proportion as California and Oregon shall increase in population and wealth.

…

No civil government having been provided by Congress for California, the people of that Territory, impelled by the necessities of their political condition, recently met in convention for the purpose of forming a constitution and State government, which the latest advices give me reason to suppose has been accomplished; and it is believed they will shortly apply for the admission of California into the Union as a sovereign State. Should such be the case, and should their constitution be conformable to the requisitions of the Constitution of the United States, I recommend their application to the favorable consideration of Congress.

The California Constitution was adopted on November 13, 1849, and Taylor submitted a proposition to admit California as a new state to Congress for debate on February 13, 1850.

Despite outlawing slavery and applying to the Union as a free state, California had elected one anti-slavery and one pro-slavery senator, John C. Frémont and William Gwin, respectively. In a 1949 address, CA state senator Herbert Jones suggests this was done as a compromise to make the state's admission more palatable to the South, but other sources make no such claim.

With the unexpected death of Taylor on July 9, 1850, Vice President Millard Fillmore became president. Although Fillmore was a northerner and was not a slaveholder, he had strong ties to the South and was much more open to a compromise that would allow the extension of slavery into the territories. The change of leadership opened the door for the passage of the Compromise of 1850, crafted by Senator Henry Clay, which allowed the admission of California into the Union without Congress imposing any limitation on the introduction of slavery. However, the Constitution adopted by the California Constitutional Convention in October 1849 in preparation for admission into the Union specifically prohibited slavery in the new state. The compromise was offset by concessions to slave states, including the possible extension of slavery into other territories ceded from Mexico and the passage of the Fugitive Slave Act of 1850, which stripped the free states of much of their legal ability to protect blacks who were suspected of fleeing slavery from kidnapping by slave catchers and forcible removal to the South.

== Texts ==
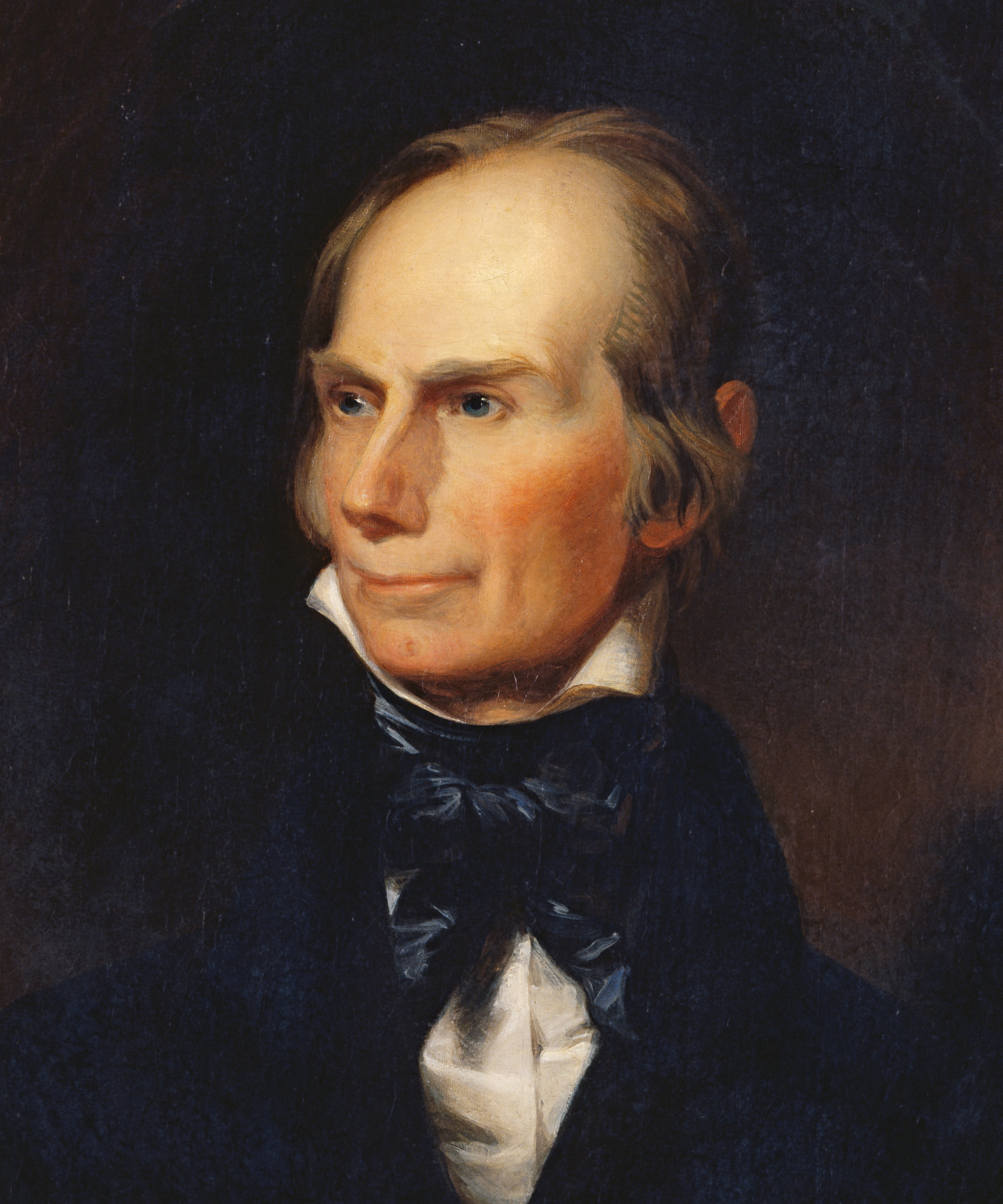
Henry Clay

=== Clay Resolutions ===
On January 29, 1850, Senator Clay proposed eight resolutions to end the heated debate over the status of the territories acquired from Mexico. Congress adopted Clay's resolutions, collectively known as the Clay Resolutions, which prepared the way for the passage of the five acts making up the Compromise of 1850. The first resolution concerned the admission of California and reads as follows:

Resolved, That California, with suitable boundaries, ought, upon her application to be admitted as one of the States of this Union, without the imposition by Congress of any restriction in respect to the exclusion or introduction of slavery within those boundaries.

=== California Admission Act ===
The California Admissions Act was the second act of the Compromise of 1850 to be passed by Congress.

The text of the act contained three sections and enacted five main provisions:

1. Admitted California as a full and equal state in the union (Section One).
2. Granted California two seats in the House of Representatives until the next Congressional reapportionment (Section Two).
3. Placed the public land in California into the federal public domain under the sole authority of Congress and outside the authority of California to tax or lay assessments (Section Three).
4. Stipulated that waterways in California would be open to free navigation by all citizens of the United States without the imposition of taxes, duties or fees for usage (Section Three).
5. Declared none of the provisions in the act of admission was to be construed as endorsing or rejecting any provision in the Constitution of California (Section Three).

The final provision in Section Three was intended as a declaration that Congress took no position on the provisions against slavery contained in the California constitution.

The text of An Act For The Admission Of The State Of California Into The Union reads as follows:

Preamble Whereas the people of California have presented a constitution and asked admission into the Union, which constitution was submitted to Congress by the president of the United States, by message dated February thirteenth, eighteen hundred and fifty, and which, on due examination, is found to be republican in its form of government:

Section 1 Be it enacted by the Senate and House of Representatives of the United States of America in Congress assembled, that the state of California shall be one, and is hereby declared to be one, of the United States of America, and admitted into the Union on an equal footing with the original states in all respects whatever.

Section 2 And be it further enacted, that, until the representatives in Congress shall be apportioned according to an actual enumeration of the inhabitants of the United States, the state of California shall be entitled to two representatives in Congress.

Section 3 And be it further enacted, that the said state of California is admitted into the Union upon the express condition that the people of said state, through their legislature or otherwise, shall never interfere with the primary disposal of the public lands within its limits, and shall pass no law and do no act whereby the title of the United States to, and right to dispose of, the same shall be impaired or questioned; and that they shall never lay any tax or assessment of any description whatsoever upon the public domain of the United States, and in no case shall nonresident proprietors, who are citizens of the United States, be taxed higher than residents; and that all the navigable waters within the said state shall be common highways, and forever free, as well to the inhabitants of said state as to the citizens of the United States, without any tax, impost, or duty therefore: provided, that nothing herein contained shall be construed as recognizing or rejecting the propositions tendered by the people of California as articles of compact in the ordinance adopted by the convention which formed the constitution of that state.

Approved, September 9, 1850.

== Admission ==
California Admission Day
- Flag of California
- Observed by: California, United States
- Type: State Holiday
- Date: September 9

With the signing of the Compromise of 1850, California was formally admitted to the Union as the 31st state in the Union on September 9, 1850. The United States House of Representatives approved the bill on September 7, 1850 by a vote of 150 to 56. The United States Senate under the careful leadership of Henry Clay and Daniel Webster had previously voted on January 17, 1850 to admit California into the Union by a vote of 48 to 3 and they concurred with the House vote on September 7, 1850.

The ad hoc territorial legislature, which would become the first legislature of the State of California after admission, first met on December 15, 1849, at San Jose, California. The first American governor of California was Peter Hardeman Burnett, who was inaugurated as the first civilian governor on December 20, 1849, prior to statehood, and continued in the position until January 9, 1851. The first two members from California to the United States Senate were San Franciscans John C. Fremont and William M. Gwin, both of whom were members of the Democratic Party and took their oaths of office on September 10, 1850. On September 11, 1850, Edward Gilbert (Democrat) and George W. Wright (Independent) took their oaths of office to become the state’s two Representatives. The Bear flag ended up being officially adopted as California's state flag in 1911.

=== California Admission Day ===
California Admission Day (September 9) is an annual legal holiday in the state, celebrated as a day of observance to commemorate its admission into the Union as the thirty-first state on that date in 1850. The city of Monterey, where the state Constitutional Convention was first held, observes this day as a City holiday, where city offices and most facilities are closed.

== Sources ==
=== Books ===
- Bordewich, Fergus M. (2013). America's Great Debate: Henry Clay, Stephen A. Douglas, and the Compromise That Preserved the Union. New York: Simon & Schuster. ISBN 978-1439124611.
- Brands, H. W. (2002). The Age of Gold: The California Gold Rush and the New American Dream. Norwall, MA: Anchor Press. ISBN 978-0385502160.
- Brands, H. W. (2018). Heirs of the Founders: The Epic Rivalry of Henry Clay, John Calhoun and Daniel Webster, the Second Generation of American Giants. Norwell, MA: Anchor Press. ISBN 978-0385542531.
- Heidler, David Stephen; Heidler, Jeanne T. (2010). Henry Clay: The Essential American. New York: Random House. ISBN 978-1400067268.
- Holt, Michael Fitzgibbon (1983). The Political Crisis of the 1850s. New York: W. W. Norton & Company. ISBN 978-0393953701.
- Holt, Michael Fitzgibbon (1999). The Rise and Fall of the American Whig Party: Jacksonian Politics and the Onset of the Civil War. London: Oxford University Press. ISBN 978-0195055443.
- Madley, Benjamin (2017). An American Genocide: The United States and the California Indian Catastrophe, 1846–1873. New Haven: Yale University Press. ISBN 978-0300230697.
- Merry, Robert W. (2010). A Country of Vast Designs: James K. Polk, the Mexican War and the Conquest of the American Continent. New York: Simon & Schuster. ISBN 978-0743297448.
- Scarry, Robert J. (2001). Millard Fillmore. Jefferson, NC: McFarland & Company. ISBN 978-0786408696.
- Starr, Kevin (1973). Americans and the California Dream, 1850–1915. London: Oxford University Press. ISBN 978-0195016444.

=== Journals ===
- Biber, Eric (2004). "The Price of Admission: Causes, Effects, and Patterns of Conditions Imposed on States Entering the Union". The American Journal of Legal History. 46 (2): 119–208. doi:10.2307/3692440. JSTOR 3692440.
- Burns, John F. (2003). "Taming the Elephant: An Introduction to California's Statehood and Constitutional Era". California History. 81 (3/4): 1–26. doi:10.2307/25161698. JSTOR 25161698.
- The Struggle for Civil Government in California, 1846–1985 by Joseph Ellison, California Historical Society Quarterly; (Part 1: Vol.10, No.1 (March, 1931), pp. 2–26 ), (Part 2: Vol.10, No.2 (June, 1931), pp. 129–164.), (Part 3: Vol 10, No.3 (September, 1931), pp. 220–244. University of California Press. (Note: Contains an excellent historical bibliography of older sources.)
- Paddison, Joshua (2003). "Capturing California". California History. 81 (3/4): 126–136. doi:10.2307/25161702. JSTOR 25161702.
- Parker, Robert J. (1939). "Clay and California Statehood". Register of the Kentucky State Historical Society. 37 (118): 57–58. JSTOR 23371517.
- Sanders, Myra K. "California Legal History: The California Constitution of 1849" (PDF). California Legal History. 90 (3). (Note: Contains an excellent bibliography.)
- Winter, Molly Crumpton (2008). "Culture-Tectonics: California Statehood and John Rollin Ridge's "Joaquín Murieta"". Western American Literature. 43 (3): 258–276. doi:10.1353/wal.2008.0004. JSTOR 43025141. S2CID 164458903.
- Woolsey, Ronald C. (1983). "A Southern Dilemma: Slavery Expansion and the California Statehood Issue in 1850—A Reconsideration". Southern California Quarterly. 65 (2): 123–144. doi:10.2307/41171032. JSTOR 41171032.
- "The Admission of California". Negro History Bulletin. 14 (1): 9. 1950. JSTOR 44212392.

== See also ==
- History of California
- History of California before 1900
- History of California 1900 to present
- Index of California-related articles
- Historical outline of California
- Territorial evolution of California
- Territorial evolution of the United States
- Admission to the Union
- Admission Day Monument in San Francisco
- Conquest of California
- Constitution of California
- Flag of California
- Popular sovereignty and slavery in the United States
- Presidency of Zachary Taylor
- Presidency of Millard Fillmore
- Slavery in the United States
- Bibliography of California history
