= California National University for Advanced Studies =

Online university headquartered in California, US

- Active: 1993–January 19, 2018
- Chairman of the Board: Janice Bryant Howroyd
- Location: Torrance, California, United States; 34.226332°N 118.502556°W
- Website: cnuas.edu

California National University for Advanced Studies was an online university headquartered in Torrance, California. The college is accredited by the Distance Education and Training Council.

The California National University closed on January 19, 2018.
