= California Northern Magazine =

American local interest magazine

California Northern was a biannual print magazine based in Sacramento, California. It was formed in 2009 by Casey Mills, a native of Shasta County, CA, and released its first issue in June 2010. Mills was publisher and editor in chief; his brother Richard Mills and Paul Barrett were executive editors.

Each issue opened with a section titled A New Regionalism. Other sections included Politics, Environment, Interview, The Arts, Fiction, Poetry, Book Review, and Notes from the Field, in which writers submitted short pieces about a particular part of Northern California.

According to San Francisco–based online news publication The Bay Citizen, the magazine is "a new biannual [taking] an old-fashioned approach on what it feels is a new movement towards localism. With an editorial staff split between the Bay Area and Sacramento, it aimed to use art, photography and long-form feature writing to capture the region."

Along with its editorial content, each issue featured work from local Northern California photographers.

The magazine published articles on subjects including solar energy, Governor Jerry Brown, water conservation, author Raymond Carver, eucalyptus trees, unincorporated "island towns" in Modesto, as well as interviews with authors Rebecca Solnit and Mark Arax. California Northern Magazine closed its doors after publishing issue 6 in 2012.
