= California Firearm Violence Research Center =

Research center at University of California

The California Firearm Violence Research Center is a research center at University of California, Davis, founded July 2017. It was approved for funding by the California state legislature on June 16, 2016. The center operates within the University of California and is the country’s first state-funded firearm violence research center. Garen Wintemute and Senator Lois Wolk led the proposal to create the center. With access to California's gun violence data, the center investigates policy efficacy, links between gun violence and alcohol abuse, and more. California's annual death rate related to gun violence has dropped 20% since 2000, despite an unchanged national rate. This center hopes to determine whether other states can replicate this outcome, as research may surface factors that led to the decline. The National Rifle Association of America opposed the inclusion of the center, as they have lobbied for decades against federal and taxpayer money researching gun violence. Several bills have been turned down in Congress due to a lack of data on the impact of gun violence on public health, and the center's founders hope to provide necessary data to advance legislation.
