= Acute rehabilitation unit =

- Other names: Inpatient rehabilitation facility
- Specialty: Physical therapist

Acute Rehabilitation Unit, is a hospital ward designated for physical medicine and rehabilitation.
