= National Equity Project =

The National Equity Project (NEP), formerly known as the Bay Area Coalition for Equitable Schools or BayCES, is a national nonprofit organization based in Oakland, California that specializes in leadership development and changing culture and conditions in order to further equity objectives in education.

The Bay Area Coalition for Equitable Schools (BayCES) changed its name to the National Equity Project in July 2010. The name was changed as the organization had expanded into new regions and began offering new services. In addition to schools, they also work with many districts and nonprofits on educational equity initiatives.

The stated purpose of the organization is to create the conditions for better educational experiences, outcomes, and life options for historically underserved students. It is best known for its leadership in Oakland small school reform, which led to the creation of over 40 new small schools in one of the largest, most successful in terms of district Academic Performance Index (API) increases, and most community-driven school reform efforts in the country.

== Early history and Small Schools Work ==
The National Equity Project began in 1991 as a regional office of the Coalition for Essential Schools, then based at Brown University. In 1995, it was founded as an independent 501(c)3 non-profit organization called the Bay Area Coalition for Essential Schools, or BayCES.

In 1998, under the leadership of Executive Director Steve Jubb, BayCES changed its name to the Bay Area Coalition for Equitable Schools to emphasize its focus on addressing achievement disparities among student groups that they argued arise from racism, classism, language bias, and other forms of systemic bias. From 1995-1999, the organization coached over a dozen comprehensive high schools in the wider Bay Area to help them enact the practices of essential schools, and to put the values of equity in practice, meaning to shift practices and re-allocate resources to help students of color, low-income students and other vulnerable students improve their academic performance. They also developed an increasingly sophisticated coaching methodology in response to the challenges of facilitating significant change in urban schools.

In 1998 the Project, then BayCES, first partnered with Oakland Community Organizations (OCO) to plan a small schools initiative in Oakland. OCO activists were working with parents who were frustrated with overcrowded, dilapidated, low-performing schools, and saw small schools in the northeast, as detailed in books and articles by Deborah Meier and others, as a way to reduce overcrowding and anonymity and improve the quality of teaching and learning.

=== BayCES' Role in Oakland School Reform ===
In 2000, BayCES partnered with the Oakland Unified School District (OUSD) and Oakland Community Organizations (OCO) to write and implement a small schools policy. The New Small Autonomous Schools (NSAS) movement was initiated by parents, teachers, and activists committed to improving education in Oakland, which had a long history of poor urban school conditions including high dropout rates, school overcrowding and violence, and teacher turnover. No new school had been built in Oakland in the 30 years before this policy was passed. These egregious conditions prevailed in the mostly Black and Latino flatlands while high quality schools served the mostly White hills.

In the reform, OCO organized the community and BayCES provided education and project management expertise. BayCES created a Small Schools Incubator to help school design teams create new schools. Design teams included teachers, leaders, parents, and sometimes students. The Project drafted a New Small Autonomous Schools policy that was passed by the Oakland School Board, authorizing the creation of a network of 10 new small schools. While the original plan in the NSAS policy was to create 10 new small schools, the reform accelerated when (1) the Bill and Melinda Gates Foundation made large grants totaling $40 million to support the small school reform (other national and mostly local funders joined forces), and (2) the district was taken over by the California Department of Education because of a district fiscal crisis. A State Administrator, Randolph Ward, replaced the superintendent Dennis Chaconas, and plans were made to convert several comprehensive high and middle schools into small schools sharing the old campuses. New small school creation became a district strategy for providing quality schools in every neighborhood. The Executive Director of BayCES, Steve Jubb, was appointed as one of two leaders (with Katrina Scott-George, Special Asst to the State Administrator) of the increasingly comprehensive reform, which included new systems of school-site budgeting, a split in the district central office between academics and school services (which became somewhat optional, enabling principals to make more decisions about procuring services for their school), and a network model of providing school services, among other innovations. This district redesign became known as Expect Success.

In 2004, BayCES transitioned the Small Schools Incubator into the district central office (where it became the now defunct New School Development Group), and in 2006 it transferred management of Expect Success. BayCES continued to coach most of the over 40 new small schools and provide consulting services to district leaders to promote the initial goals of the reform: a quality education for every child regardless of race or socioeconomic status. In a recent outside evaluation by Strategic Measurement, the new small schools in Oakland, compared to schools with similar demographics, demonstrated higher achievement, faster rates of student improvement, greatly improved graduation rates, and higher teacher, parent, and student satisfaction.

In 2004 Oakland was the most improved large district in the state of California in terms of district Academic Performance Index, which it has continued to be for the following six years. From 2000-8, the organization adopted a place-based strategy to focus on equity efforts in Oakland, Emeryville, and Berkeley, and stopped work in other places.

=== BayCES Education Reform Approach ===
BayCES worked with schools to improve student achievement, close student achievement gaps, and improve school climate and functioning primarily through school coaching. School coaches focused on principal leadership and teacher team collaboration to help schools develop practices and capacities that research has shown to be effective in improving student learning. As an affiliate of the Coalition of Essential Schools, BayCES promoted essential school and small school characteristics such as personalized learning, project-based learning, differentiated instruction, advisory, and parent involvement.

An uncommon feature of BayCES coaching is that its coaches bring a strong "equity stance" to work in schools, meaning that they believe that schools tend to reproduce social injustices and inequality, and they strive to end education-based historic oppression. This social justice or "equity" approach often entails working with staff to improve cultural competence and encouraging school staff to have "courageous conversations" that confront racism and classism (personal and institutional) that may be contributing to poor educational results for children of color and low-income children.

== Name Change & New Identity ==
In 2007, a new Executive Director LaShawn Route Chatmon was hired by the board after the retirement of Steve Jubb. Under LaShawn's leadership, the organization began to focus increasingly on two levers for further improving education outcomes for vulnerable children: leadership development, and learning partnerships in instruction. In 2008-9, they developed new approaches and offered increased service to partners in these areas: Leading for Equity and Impact 2012 (Teaching for Equity). They sought and received major grants from new partner foundations to develop these areas: from the Kellogg Foundation to expand Leading for Equity programs, and from the Carnegie Corporation to develop and expand Impact 2012. The Impact 2012 has been evaluated by two external evaluators, including Stanford University's SRN center, and was found to improve teacher usage of formative assessment and improve academic performance significantly among targeted low-achieving students. The Leading for Equity program is currently being evaluated, and is informed by recent research on adaptive leadership, complexity science and systems change theory.

The organization's core insight is that people make change, and all education reform efforts need to take the development of people fully into account in order to succeed. In the National Equity Project analysis, most efforts rely on technical fixes or top-down mandates that do not develop people's capacity to carry out desired changes on behalf of vulnerable students. People's capacity has to be developed both in terms of technical proficiency (instruction, planning) and in terms of human relations, since collaboration, communication, and relationships are at the heart of any successful endeavor. In highly bureaucratic school systems, these basic truths are often forgotten.

No longer limited to the Bay Area or schools, the organization changed its name in 2010. As the National Equity Project, they have formally launched an effort to change the national conversation about achieving equity in education, and began working increasingly with community-wide initiatives to reduce disparities that result from structural racism.

== Recent Work ==
- From 2010-2025, NEP partnered with thousands of schools, districts, foundations, government agencies and nonprofit organizations across the U.S., providing equity-focused leadership development consulting services to support partners to make impact on their equity goals.
- In 2015, NEP launched its Center for Equity Leadership (CEL), building on the success of open-registration Leading for Equity and Coaching for Equity Institutes. In addition to training 1000s of leaders through open-registration professional development, from 2016-2021 CEL hosted 5 cohorts of Leading for Equity Fellowships, providing a leadership intensive to 100+ education leaders.
- In 2016, NEP became the fiscal sponsor of the Black Teacher Project (BTP), a new program focused on developing Black teacher leadership. BTP became an NEP program in 2020.
- In 2016, NEP partnered with colleagues at the Stanford d.school to explore the intersection of design thinking and equity. The Liberatory Design framework emerged from this partnership.
- In 2017, NEP joins the BELE Network, an effort to unite educators, researchers, and organizations to develop evidence-based practices for equitable learning.
- 2015-2018, NEP’s Leading for Equity Framework is developed and articulated, providing a grounding frame of reference for consulting services and professional development, namely the heuristics of “see, engage, act” and its disciplines of equity, complexity, and liberatory design.
- From 2019-2023, NEP led the BELE-NEP District Network partnering directly with a national cohort of districts. The goal of the district network was to learn how to apply our Leading for Equity approach and methods to support districts in using data-driven methods to improve student experiences. In 2023, NEP launched its District Redesign Network service building on the lessons of this work. In 2023, NEP published a series of resources on Youth-Adult Co-Design and Design Partnerships, providing resources for educators and other adults to develop the practices, tools, and mindsets needed to effectively listen to students and partner with them to co-lead change efforts
- In 2025, NEP defined a new strategic direction, renewing its commitment to developing leaders in K12 public education ecosystems in service of demonstrating what is possible and mobilizing the field to protect and transform public education. In March 2025 NEP published Adaptive Strategic Planning for Education Leaders, a resource for district leaders to navigate complexity and uncertainty while bridging the relational and political divides present in communities across the country.

== Bibliography ==
- National Equity Project web site
