= California Festival of Beers =

Festival in Avila Beach, California, US

The California Festival of Beers is an annual beer festival and one of America's largest and oldest regional beer tastings. It is held at the Madonna Inn Meadows in San Luis Obispo, California, the festival is a prominent event in the state's craft brewing scene. All proceeds from the festival benefit the Hospice of San Luis Obispo County, a non profit organization providing free support services for individuals and families experiencing illness, loss, or grief.

== History and development ==
Established in 1984, the festival began as a modest gathering in the parking lot of a local pub. Over the years, it expanded significantly in both scale and popularity, becoming a cornerstone event in California’s beer culture. For many years, the festival was hosted at the Avila Beach Resort in Avila Beach, California. In 2013, it was relocated to its current venue at the Madonna Inn Meadows to accommodate its growing audience and programming needs.

== Festival format and activities ==
Commonly referred to as "Beer Fest," the California Festival of Beers is traditionally held over Memorial Day weekend. It features over 50 craft brewers, showcasing a wide variety of microbrew beers. The event typically attracts over 4,500 attendees, including large numbers of college students from regional institutions such as UCSB, Cal Poly, and Fresno.

The festival spans two days, offering distinct experiences each day. The first day is centered around the “Arts and Drafts” Connoisseur Pairing, held at the Madonna Expo Center. This event blends craft beer tastings with local cuisine, visual art exhibits, and live music performances, appealing to patrons with a more refined interest in beer and food pairings. The atmosphere encourages exploration of the culinary and artistic dimensions of brewing, including suggested pairings with cigars.

The second day features the Grand Tasting, an outdoor celebration held in the expansive Madonna Meadows. This portion of the festival is designed for a broad audience and includes unlimited beer tastings, a variety of food vendors, lawn games, and live entertainment. Additional amenities include a souvenir beer glass, complimentary shuttle service provided by SLO Safe Ride, and special designated-driver ticket options to promote responsible participation.

The California Festival of Beers has become a hallmark of the Central Coast’s social calendar, blending community celebration with support for a meaningful cause.
