= ACEC California =

The American Council of Engineering Companies of California (ACEC California) is a statewide group representing consulting engineering and land surveying firms in California. The organization promotes use of the private sector in the growth and improvement of California. The ACEC California membership provides engineering, surveying, construction management and environmental consulting services for all project phases.

As of February 2010 the membership includes nearly 1100 civil, structural, geotechnical, electrical and mechanical engineering and land surveying firms. The member firms provide services for all types of public works, residential, commercial and industrial projects.

In November 2000, California voters by a wide margin approved Proposition 35, a landmark measure sponsored by ACEC California. Prop 35 was endorsed by hundreds of organizations representing taxpayers, seniors, schools, local governments, business, labor, and engineers and almost unanimously by California's newspapers. This measure authorized state and local governments to engage in public-private partnerships with qualified engineers like those represented by ACEC California to speed up the delivery of transportation, water, education, energy, housing and many other public works projects.

Since the passage of Prop 35 ACEC California continues to work with California officials to develop more ways to deliver vital new infrastructure quickly, efficiently and cost effectively. Members of the public can find California based engineering and surveying firms through an online, searchable database.

It is the largest state-member organization of the American Council of Engineering Companies.
