= California Social Security Fairness Act of 2013 =

The California Social Security Fairness Act of 2013 is also known as California Senate Bill 896 is a California law that repeals the government pension offset and windfall elimination provisions of the United States Social Security Act.

Obama campaigned to repeal the unfair Windfall Elimination Provision (WEP) and Government Pension Offset (GPO) - laws which have stripped millions of our elderly of the bulk of their earned Social Security benefits. Obama promised he would support passage of the Social Security Fairness Act.

But the Social Security Administration's site below shows that in fiscal year 2015 President Obama's Budget includes “a proposal to develop automated data exchanges for states and localities.” And this information will be used to reduce “improper (WEP or GPO) payments .“

http://www.ssa.gov/budget/FY15Files/2015FCJ.pdf
