= List of California area codes =

List of all telephone area codes in California

Numbering plan areas in California (blue) and border states.

As of March 2025, the U.S. state of California is served by 41 area codes in the North American Numbering Plan.

Area code	Service area	Notes
209	Stockton, Modesto, Merced, Turlock; the northern San Joaquin Valley and the central Sierra Nevada range.	Split from 916 in 1958; split off 559 on November 14, 1998; overlaid with 350 on November 28, 2022
213	Much of the City of Los Angeles and several inner suburbs	October 1947; split numerous times since then, including a split to form code 323 on June 13, 1998; in August 2017, the boundary between 213 and 323 was erased to form an overlay.
279	Sacramento and most of the Sacramento metro: Folsom, Roseville; Sacramento County and southern Placer County	overlay with 916, started service on March 10, 2018.
310	The western and southwestern parts of Los Angeles County, including the Westside and South Bay regions. These include the cities and towns of Santa Monica, Malibu, Pacific Palisades, Compton, Torrance, Beverly Hills, and Catalina Island.	Split from 213 on November 2, 1991; overlaid by 424 on August 26, 2006
323	Much of the City of Los Angeles and several inner suburbs	originally split off from 213 to form a ring around downtown Los Angeles and the city of Montebello on June 13, 1998; in August 2017, the boundary between 213 and 323 was erased to form an overlay. On November 1, 2024, it was overlaid by area code 738.
341	overlay with 510	started service on July 22, 2019.
350	overlay with 209	started service on November 28, 2022.
357	overlay with 559	started service on March 26, 2025
369	overlay with 707	started service on February 1, 2023.
408	San Jose, Sunnyvale, Gilroy, Morgan Hill, and Los Gatos; most of Santa Clara County.	Split from 415 on January 1, 1959; overlaid by 669 on November 20, 2012
415	San Francisco, San Rafael, Novato; all of San Francisco County, most of Marin County and a small portion of northern San Mateo County	October 1947; split numerous times since then; overlaid by 628 effective March 21, 2015
424	overlay with 310	started service on August 26, 2006.
442	overlay with 760	started service on October 24, 2009.
510	Oakland, Fremont, Hayward, Berkeley and Richmond; western Alameda and Contra Costa Counties.	Split from 415 on September 2, 1991; overlaid by 341 on July 22, 2019
530	Redding, Chico, Davis, Marysville, Red Bluff, Oroville, Placerville, Truckee, Yuba City; northeastern California including most of the Sacramento Valley, the northern Sierra Nevada and the Lake Tahoe region.	Split from 916 on November 1, 1997
559	Fresno, Visalia, Madera, Hanford; the central San Joaquin Valley and the southern Sierra Nevada range.	Split from 209 on November 14, 1998
562	Long Beach, Whittier, Norwalk, Lakewood, Bellflower, Cerritos, southeast Los Angeles County and a small portion of coastal Orange County.	Split from 310 on January 25, 1997
619	City of San Diego and suburbs	created by a split from 714 on November 5, 1982; split off 760 on March 22, 1997, and 858 on June 12, 1999; re-merged with 858 in June 2018 to create the 619/858 overlay
626	Most of the San Gabriel Valley including Pasadena, El Monte, West Covina.	Split from 818 on June 14, 1997
628	San Francisco, San Rafael, Novato; all of San Francisco County, most of Marin County and a small portion of northern San Mateo County	Overlay with 415, started service on March 21, 2015
650	San Mateo, Palo Alto, Redwood City, Daly City; most of San Mateo County and northwestern Santa Clara County (i.e., the San Francisco Peninsula with the exception of the city and county of San Francisco).	Split from 415 on August 2, 1997
657	Anaheim, Huntington Beach, Santa Ana, Orange, Westminster, Garden Grove, etc.; northern and western Orange County	Overlay with 714, started service on September 23, 2008
661	Most of Kern County including Bakersfield; northern Los Angeles County including Lancaster, Palmdale, and Santa Clarita.	Split from 805 on February 13, 1999
669	San Jose, Sunnyvale, Gilroy, Morgan Hill, and Los Gatos; most of Santa Clara County.	Overlay with 408, started service on November 20, 2012
707	Santa Rosa, Eureka, Sebastopol, Petaluma, Napa, Vallejo, Fairfield; northwestern California, including the northern Bay Area, the Redwood Empire and the Wine Country.	Split from 916 on March 1, 1959
714	Anaheim, Huntington Beach, Santa Ana, Orange, Westminster, Garden Grove, etc.; northern and western Orange County	Split from 213 in 1951 and split numerous times since then; overlaid by 657 on September 23, 2008
738	overlay with 213 and 323	started service on November 1, 2024.
747	The San Fernando Valley of Los Angeles County: Burbank, Van Nuys, Glendale, Chatsworth, San Fernando, Panorama City and Northridge.	Overlay with 818, started service on May 18, 2009
760	Palm Springs, Oceanside, Bishop, Ridgecrest, Barstow, El Centro, Needles, Victorville; northern San Diego County, eastern Riverside and San Bernardino Counties (including much of the Mojave Desert), and the Owens Valley.	Split from 619 on March 22, 1997; overlaid by 442 on October 24, 2009
805	Santa Barbara, San Luis Obispo, Ventura, Oxnard, Santa Maria, Santa Paula; southwest Central Coast, including San Luis Obispo, Santa Barbara and Ventura counties.	Split from 213 on January 1, 1957; split off 661 on February 13, 1999; overlaid with 820 on July 2, 2018.
818	The San Fernando Valley of Los Angeles County: Burbank, Van Nuys, Glendale, Chatsworth, San Fernando, Panorama City and Northridge.	Split from 213 on January 7, 1984; split off 626 on June 14, 1997; overlaid by 747 on May 18, 2009
820	Santa Barbara, San Luis Obispo, Ventura, Oxnard, Santa Maria, Santa Paula; southwest Central Coast, including San Luis Obispo, Santa Barbara and Ventura counties.	Overlay with 805, started service on July 2, 2018
831	Monterey, Santa Cruz, Salinas, and Hollister; the northern Central Coast.	Split from 408 on July 11, 1998
837	overlay with 530	started service on January 31, 2025.
840	San Bernardino, Ontario, Pomona, and Chino; eastern Los Angeles County and southwestern San Bernardino County.	Overlay of 909 effective February 23, 2021
858	City of San Diego and suburbs	Originally created by a split from 619 on June 12, 1999; however, re-merged with 619 to create the 619/858 overlay in June 2018
909	San Bernardino, Ontario, Pomona, and Chino; eastern Los Angeles County and southwestern San Bernardino County.	Split from 714 on November 14, 1992; split off 951 on July 17, 2004; overlaid with 840 effective February 23, 2021.
916	Sacramento and most of the Sacramento metro: Folsom, Roseville; Sacramento County and southern Placer County	October 1947; overlaid with 279 on March 10, 2018
925	Concord, Walnut Creek, Livermore, Pleasanton, San Ramon, Martinez, and Antioch; eastern Alameda and Contra Costa Counties.	Split from 510 on March 14, 1998
949	Irvine, Laguna Beach, Newport Beach, San Juan Capistrano, San Clemente; southern and eastern Orange County.	Split from 714 on April 18, 1998
951	Riverside, Corona, Moreno Valley, Perris, Temecula, Murrieta; western Riverside County.	Split from 909 on July 17, 2004

== History ==
In 1947, the American Telephone and Telegraph Company (AT&T) devised the first nationwide telephone numbering plan and assigned the original North American area codes. The state of California was divided into three numbering plan areas (NPAs) with distinct area codes: 213, 415, and 916, for the southern, central, and northern parts of the state, respectively.

In 1949, Oakland, CA, received the fifth regional dial switching center for Operator Toll Dialing in the nation/ In 1950, the boundaries of the California numbering plan areas were redrawn to produce a division of the northern and central parts along a north–south-running dividing line. Numbering plan area 415 became the coastal region from the North Coast to the Oregon border, while 916 was redrawn to comprise the northeastern corner of the state. This realignment resulted in Sacramento changing from area code 415 to 916, and Bakersfield to 213.

During the initial trials of DDD in Englewood, New Jersey, starting in 1951, area code 318 was temporarily installed for the new toll-switching center in San Francisco to separate calls destined through Oakland (415), as six-digit translation was not available until 1953.

In subsequent decades the California numbering plan areas underwent many area code splits and area code overlay arrangements.

== See also ==
- List of North American Numbering Plan area codes
