= California Senate Bill 535 (2012) =

California climate law

California State Legislature
- Full name: California Senate Bill 535(SB 535)
- Signed into law: September 30, 2012
- Sponsor: Kevin de León
- Governor: Jerry Brown
- Code: Health and Safety Code
- Section: 39711, 39713, 39715, 39721, and 39723
- Resolution: SB 535
- Website: leginfo.legislature.ca.gov/faces/billNavClient.xhtml?bill_id=201120120SB535

Status: Amended

California Senate Bill 535 is a California bill that was introduced by Senator Kevin De Leon of Los Angeles and signed into law on September 30, 2012 by Governor Jerry Brown. SB 535 is largely based on the actions introduced by Global Warming Solutions Act of 2006, commonly known as AB 32. AB 32 was passed in 2006 and its goal is to reduce greenhouse gas emissions in California. The process outlined by AB 32 resulted in the creation of a cap-and-trade system in California. Companies must purchase extra credits when they exceed their allotted amount for the cap and trade. Each year, the money generated from companies purchasing extra credits is expected to generate about $1 billion of state revenue. SB 535 requires that 25% of the fund is spent on projects that benefit disadvantaged communities, while at least 10% of the 25% is spent on projects located in disadvantaged communities. Cal Enviroscreen is a screening methodology that identifies disadvantaged communities that the funds will be directed into. The money will be spent on projects that have been approved by the Legislature.

== History ==
De Leon introduced AB 1405, a bill that it very similar to SB 535. It was vetoed by Governor Arnold Schwarzenegger in 2010, because the Governor stated that “funds have yet to be realized by AB 32.” SB 535 was introduced by Senator De Leon on February 17, 2011. After the bill's introduction, an analysis that addressed some concerns was posted on April 29, 2011. Initially, opponents of the bill were concerned with the fact that “a regulatory fee must have a nexus between fee payers, the fee amount and the revenue use.” SB 535 does not meet this standard “because the amount of fee revenue is arbitrary (10% of the total amount raised), the purposes in SB 535 are unrelated to harm caused by the payers, and there is no demonstrated connection between the proposed recipients and harm caused by the payers of the revenues.” Other opponents noted that it was impossible to know how much money was necessary to meet the requirements of AB 32 of reducing emissions to the 1990 level by the year 2020. If SB 535 was passed, it might be detracting from the original goals of AB 32. After three Committee readings, the bill was passed on to the Assembly on June 2, 2011. After three Assembly readings and amendments, it was passed on to the California Senate. The Senate floor voted on the bill on August 31, 2012. The bill passed with 25 people voting “yes,” 14 voting “no,” and 1 person abstaining. On September 30, 2012 Governor Jerry Brown signed the bill and passed it into law.

== Implications of environmental justice on SB 535 ==
People who live in communities of color, low-income, and disadvantaged communities face health disparities due to poor air quality. Many of these communities are located near industries and means of transportation that cause a large amount of pollution to affect these areas. There is a greater abundance of harmful particulate matter in air pollution around these non-white and poorer communities than in white and wealthier communities. People who live near refineries are more likely to breathe in nickel and vanadium, and those living near coal power plants are more likely to breathe in contents of high sulfate. Also, those who live near means of transportation such as busy highways are exposed to nitrates from vehicle exhaust. SB 535 is an example of environmental justice because it creates a solution to help these communities that have been affected by health disparities from the high exposures of “not only carbon dioxide, but also soot, methane, carbon monoxide and ozone. Many of these pollutants are associated with cancer, low birth weights, heart attacks, as well as respiratory problems like asthma and chronic obstructive pulmonary disease.” In addition, SB 535 guarantees that 10% of the 25% of money collected from the revenue can be directed towards reducing pollution and lessening the harmful health impacts from greenhouse gas emissions. Supporters of the SB 535 bill such as the American Lung Association and Regional Asthma Management and Prevention (RAMP) are making efforts to fight the health disparities that are a result from the polluting air.

== Reinvestment of cap-and-trade revenue ==
=== Process ===
SB 535 falls under the three year reinvestment plan to use the cap and trade auction proceeds to meet the goals of The Global Warming Solutions Act of 2006, more commonly known as AB 32. The process for redirecting cap and trade auction proceeds follows two steps, which is mainly facilitated by the California Department of Finance. First, a three-year investment plan requires the Department of Finance, California Air Resources Board (ARB) and other state agencies to identify which proceeds from cap and trade programs will be directed towards current greenhouse gas reduction goals, investments for future reductions and allocation of funds to projects located in disadvantaged communities. Second, before the investment plan is submitted to Legislature and Governor, the Department of Finance and the ARB must hold two workshops and a hearing with the Finance and Climate Action Team. In addition, the members of SB 535 Coalition's main committee, Asian Pacific Environmental Network (APEN), Coalition for Clean Air, the Greenlining Institute, and public advocates which helped co-sign Senator Kevin de León's SB 535, have also provided input to which programs can be included in the state's three-year plan for cap-and-trade revenues. The main goals of using the proceeds from the Greenhouse Reduction Fund through the process of this the three-year investment plan is to help disadvantaged communities with projects that will improve their transportation, housing situations, jobs, while moving forward in the reduction of greenhouse gases and energy efficiency.

== Cap-and-trade ==
SB 535 uses profits from the cap-and-trade policy, which went into effect in California in 2013, to fund projects that are beneficial for disadvantaged communities. The cap-and-trade came about as a way to lessen the environmental impact of companies on the community. The system is relatively simple and easy to put into action. A regulatory agency sets up a cap on the amount of pollutants any one company can put into the environment. Once the amount of allowed pollution is determined, companies can sell these allowances to other companies. The funds collected from the cap-and-trade go into the Greenhouse Gas Reduction Fund. Studies have indicated that “cap and trade has been a principal part of the US Environmental Protection Agency’s efforts to reduce US emissions of sulfur dioxide under the Clean Air Act.” By placing a cap on the amount of pollutants a company can produce, the system encourages companies to be innovative a look for cleaner production habits. The goal of this system is to reduce a company's harmful impact on the environment and community. Similarly, the goal of SB 535 is to take 25% of the funds from the sale of the allowance credits and invest them into projects aimed at helping disadvantaged communities with a minimum of 10% of the profits being funneled directly into Environmental Justice communities.

Some qualities that have contributed to the success of the cap-and-trade are the ease and accuracy of measuring pollutants and the fact that allowances are much less expensive to pay for than the fee for going over the allotted amount of pollution. Additionally, the cap-and-trade is significantly cheaper than other regulatory approaches. On the other hand, some challenges arise when it comes to fulfilling the cap-and-trade's main goal of reducing environmental pollutants. Since there is no nationwide system, some states with less strict regulations will end up emitting more pollutants than states with stricter regulation and some people claim that in the end, the pollution will just be spread differently across the country. Some groups claim that this system isn't very effective in reducing emissions, but it is supported because of the amount of revenue it generates for the state.

=== Reinvestment options of SB 535 ===
Possible reinvestments options to reduce greenhouse gas emissions:

- Low carbon transportation and infrastructure
- Strategic planning for sustainable infrastructure
- Energy efficiency and clean energy
- Natural resources and solid waste diversion

Possible triple bottom line investments:

- Energy efficiency for schools
- Urban forestry/green space
- Sustainable agricultural practices
- Mass transit

Example of actual reinvestment plans:

- On January 9, 2014, Governor Brown announced that he will direct $50 million from the revenue of cap-and-trade revenue in the 2014-2015 state budget towards "urban forestry projects that help meet the state’s goal of reducing greenhouse gases."

SB 535 states that 25% of cap-and-trade proceeds must go towards projects that help disadvantaged communities, and Governor Brown's proposal to fund urban forestry projects is a great example of reinvestment.

== Identifying disadvantaged communities ==
=== CalEnviroScreen ===
The California Environmental Protection Agency (CEPA) is in charge of the identifying disadvantaged communities. In order to facilitate the identification of low-income and highly polluted areas, the state's Office of Environmental Health Hazard Assessment (OEHHA) and CEPA have adopted the California Communities Environmental Health Screening Tool, more commonly known as the “Cal EnviroScreen.”

The use of Cal EnviroScreen will mainly be for SB 535. The main goal is to accurately locate areas/neighborhoods using pollution “scores”. It is a scientific-based tool on the California Environmental Protection Agency study of 1,769 distinct ZIP code areas that measures environmental, socioeconomic and health indicators such as

- Ozone concentrations in air
- PM2.5 concentrations in air
- Diesel particulate matter emissions
- Use of certain high-hazard, high-volatility pesticides
- Toxic releases from facilities
- Traffic density
- Drinking water quality
- Toxic cleanup sites
- Groundwater threats from leaking underground storage sites and cleanups
- Hazardous waste facilities and generators
- Impaired water bodies
- Solid waste sites and facilities
- Children and elderly
- Asthma emergency department visits
- Low birth-weight infants
- Educational attainment
- Linguistic isolation
- Poverty
- Unemployment

=== Changes to the Cal EnviroScreen ===
In the past year, with the addition of water quality data, now it is possible to take into consideration the communities that have been affected by groundwater pollution. Also, this new factor can address the issue of the lack of clean drinking water within disadvantaged communities. In addition, now the OEHHA is moving towards identifying areas based on the census tract rather than zipcodes. The problem with recording pollution under the current use of zip codes in such large areas is that it's very difficult to be accurate. A major goal of SB 535 is to make sure that a minimum of 25% of the cap and trade revenue will be distributed to highly impacted communities that face burdens from different types of pollution.

As of September 16, 2013 OEHHA has decided that CalEnviroScreen will no longer use race and ethnicity as a factor when identifying disadvantaged communities. Using such factors make it difficult for the government not to be faced with lawsuits, the Equal Protection Clause of the U.S. Constitution and the California Civil Rights Initiative, known as proposition 209, when choosing where to invest the funds under sb 535. However, OEHHA's scientists say that Cal EnviroScreen will still be able to identify disadvantaged communities without concerning race or ethnicity because there will be continual research towards connecting population's scores and their racial and ethnic makeup.

== Advocacy ==
SB 535 was signed into law by Governor Jerry Brown on September 30, 2012. The co-sponsoring organizations are the Asian Pacific Environmental Network, Coalition for Clean Air, Greenlining Institute, and Public Advocates, and the bill has gained support from a number of groups, including:

- Breathe California
- California League of Conservation Voters
- California Pan-Ethnic Health Network
- Catholic Charities
- Stockton Diocese
- Coalition for Clean Air
- Environment California
- Environmental Defense Fund
- Greenlining Institute
- Los Angeles Bicycle Coalition
- Natural Resources Defense Council
- Sierra Club California
- TransForm
- The Trust for Public Lands

Groups opposing the bill include:

- American Council of Engineering Companies
- California Building Industry Association
- California Chamber of Commerce
- California Farm Bureau Federation
- California Manufacturers & Technology Association
- The California Retailers Association

The Coalition for Clean Air has been the main supporter of SB 535. The group has offices in Los Angeles, Sacramento, and Fresno, and they have “worked to restore clean air to California since 1971.” The Clean Air Coalition, along with many other groups, wrote a letter to Mary Nichols, the Chairman of the California Air Resources Board on March 8, 2013. In the letter, the coalition wished to “express support for the CalEnviroScreen as a tool to inform the identification of disadvantaged communities, provide more detail on the use of the overarching and “SB 535 Principles” that our coalition has developed and previously shared with the Administration, identify the priority AB 32 programs that will effectively serve these communities and legal mandates, and provide additional comments on the implementation considerations.” The coalition has worked closely with the state to ensure that disadvantaged communities are properly identified and funds are being appropriately used to help these communities have better air quality and less environmental pollutants.

Many individual organizations have held workshops and meetings to discuss SB 535 and its implications within California communities such as the Luskin Center at UCLA and the Public Health Alliance of Southern California. Discussion topics range from identifying disadvantages communities to helping the state develop new reinvestment options.

== Controversy ==
In May 2013, CA Governor Jerry Brown borrowed $500 million of the year’s cap and trade revenue. The governor intended to use the $500 million, coming from the Greenhouse Gas Reduction Fund, to fund the state’s general expenses. Opponents of Brown’s decision, such as The Greenlining institute, the Sierra Club and other environmental groups argue that this money should solely go towards programs that were intended to help low-income and disadvantaged communities. Brown said that he would pay back the borrowed money with interest.

In early January, Brown proposed to return $100 million of the $500 million borrowed, and added an additional $600 million to his budget of $154.9 billion, that would go towards “efficiency retrofits and solar installations for low-income communities, low-carbon transportation, transit-friendly planning and other programs.”

Governor Brown also proposed a plan for a high-speed rail project with a budget of $68.4 billion, a third of the proceeds from the cap and trade revenue, that would provide transportation from San Francisco to Los Angeles by 2028. This project is raising concerns from both environmentalists and lawmakers because they have criticized whether the project would help meet the goal of AB 32 intending to cut greenhouse gas emissions by 2020. Instead, Sierra Club California Director Kathryn Phillips states "The best use of the cap-and-trade funds is to invest them in projects that are out there now" — such as improving energy efficiency — "that can get us near-term emission reductions."
