= California Latino Leadership Fund =

Former Oakland-based organization for expenditures

The California Latino Leadership Fund (not to be confused with the Hispanic College Fund, Hispanic Heritage Foundation or California Latino Leadership Institute) was an Oakland-based organization involved in multiple independent expenditures during California's Assembly District Elections in 2006. On June 10 and 11 of 2005, the California Latino Leadership Fund spent a total of $192,028 on independent expenditures within California's 43rd, 57th, and 34th Assembly District elections. Funding to the organization allegedly came from multiple sources, including PG&E, Johnson & Johnson, and Cendant Corp. Controversy arose following alleged use of mass mailers and automated callers to non-Armenian voters labeling Krekorian and his wife, the Armenian National Committee of America (ANCA) and the Armenian community as “terrorists” in a desperate attempt to scare away non-Armenian voters.

== Spending history and funding ==
Campaign finance report consolidation organization Follow The Money published information regarding the California Latino Leadership Fund's spending during the 2006 California's Assembly District Elections. The organization found that the California Latino Leadership Fund spent $99,398 in support of California District 34's Lou Correa (Democrat) on June 11, $42,630 in support of California's District 57's Renee Chavez (Democrat), $31,567 in support of California District 43's Frank Quintero (Democrat) on June 10, and $18,433 on June 10 in opposition to Quintero's opponent, Paul Krekorian (Democrat).

Funding to the organization allegedly came from tribal gaming groups, Pacific Gas and Electric, Johnson & Johnson, Inc., and Cendant Corp. Funding was also traced back to California's Latino Caucus.

Due to the nature of the campaign spending done by the California Latino Leadership Fund, Quintero's campaign would have to break law to organize independent expenditures with a separate entity.

== California's 43rd Assembly District 2006 Election Controversy ==
City Of Glendale request for investigation regarding 2006 distribution of controversial media fliers

Leading up to California's 43rd Assembly District 2006 Election, campaign mailers and automated calls, allegedly funded by the California Latino Leadership Fund, were widely dispersed. These campaign mailers and automated calls attempted to link Quintero's Armenian-American opponent, Krekorian, to terrorism by way of the Armenian National Committee of America. The fliers attempted to draw connections between the Armenian National Committee of America, who endorsed Krekorian, and terrorist activities after a former Armenian National Committee leader was convicted in 2001 of possessing stolen explosives and assault weapons. This Armenian National Committee official had separated from the group following his conviction, and is no longer part of the organization.

Following the campaign mailers and automated calls, Armenian voters turned out in large numbers to support Paul Krekorian. Throughout his campaign, Armenian Americans volunteered to support Krekorian in record numbers, including on the day of the election, during which time volunteers helped get out the vote, assisted at polling stations with translating while also monitoring and reporting problems and irregularities that occur during every election. During the weeks leading up to the election local the Armenian National Committee mounted an unprecedented voter education and get-out-the-vote campaign informing large numbers of voters of the issues at stake and getting people to vote.

Upon the election's conclusion, Krekorian had won with 56.6% of the votes to Quintero’s 43.4%, with 100 percent of precincts reporting.

=== Reaction ===
Following the use of mailers and automated calls, city officials requested investigation by the state Attorney general Bill Lockyer into the campaign mailer. Quintero also pressed for an investigation, saying ' "I will either make the motion or second that motion. I've condemned the mailer when it first came out, and I've followed up with a letter to the attorney general and the secretary of state. ... We absolutely had no idea that was taking place." "Councilman Bob Yousefian, a member of the council's Armenian-American majority and a Krekorian supporter, still faults Quintero for the mailer. 'It came out on a Friday night,' he said. 'On Friday night and Saturday, not once did Mr. Quintero come out and say he had nothing to do with it. If it was me, I would've been on TV Friday. ... Maybe the attorney general can get to the bottom of this.'" Quintero denied any knowledge or involvement with the Latino Leadership Fund or its activities. Quintero followed up by issuing mailers to the Latino Leadership Fund, stating his disapproval of the mailers in question.

California Latino Leadership Fund officials declined comment on the allegations.
