= California Supplemental Exam =

US professional licensure exam

The California Supplemental Examination is a professional licensure exam established and regulated by the California Architects Board. In order to become a licensed architect in the State of California, a candidate must pass this exam in addition to passing the required national architect registration exams, and completing all other requirements. The exam was previously delivered in an oral format, but around 2010 it was converted to be a computer-delivered, multiple-choice examination.

The exam is administered through a vendor, by permission of the California Architects Board. Upon completion of the Intern Development Program and successful completion of the Architect Registration Examination, a candidate is then permitted to sit for the California Supplemental Exam. The test plan is organized into four separate topics covering a variety of specific aspects of architectural Practice.

== Exam procedure ==
The exam was previously a structured oral examination that lasted approximately 1.5 hours. It was administered by a panel of three architects with current California registration. A question was asked to the candidate, with no further clarification of the question allowed. The candidate was to give an answer that is scored by each member of the panel independently. The number of questions was approximately thirty.

Candidates were given the opportunity to demonstrate through oral responses their overall understanding of architectural practice, and required to demonstrate at least entry-level competence in the areas outlined in the CSE test plan. A competent entry-level architect is able to discharge the responsibilities incumbent upon him or her in providing professional architectural services to the public. Additionally, a competent entry-level architect must understand the integration of architectural practice and the architect's responsibilities as they relate to architectural practice in California.

The exam is based on a hypothetical project and includes graphic and written documents that candidates have the opportunity to review prior to - and have access to during - the CSE. The project description and graphics provide a focus for the examination questions and establish a context for candidate responses.

The oral format was phased out in 2010, and the exam is now in a timed computer-delivered multiple choice format.

== Test plan ==
The test plan has not changed since the format of the test moved from oral to multiple choice on a computer, and is based on the results of a statewide survey of practicing California architects. The intent of the test plan is not to duplicate coverage of general areas of practice already addressed by the national test, the Architectural Registration Examination, but to focus on California-specific aspects of practice; it is therefore neither comprehensive nor representative of the full scope of architectural practice.

The exam administered in 2024 was based on a test plan that is divided into five categories of architectural knowledge and abilities important to the tasks that California architects perform, as follows with their approximated weight:

1. Contract Development / Project Planning (25%)
2. Schematic Design / Discretionary Approvals (30%)
3. Design Development (15%)
4. Construction Documents / Permitting (10%)
5. Project Bidding and Construction (20%)

The board has a list of reference materials for the 2024 administrations which can assist candidates in preparing for the exam. The list details the resources with which to be familiar and how they may be obtained. Some of the materials are available for a nominal cost, and others for free.
