= California Outside Music Association =

American nonprofit music organization

The California Outside Music Association (a.k.a. COMA) was a nonprofit music presenter and networking organization operating in the Los Angeles area from 1983 until 1991. The organization is best known for producing the album A Beginner’s Guide to COMA and a series of festivals called Day of Music. Founded by Titus Levi and Eric Potruch, COMA officially launched on March 3, 1983, when the two founders passed out a flyer describing COMA’s planned activities. This flyer came to be known as The COMA Manifesto. COMA's goals included bringing an eclectic scope of artists from diverse genres, for concerts and festivals. Genres included (but were not limited to) jazz, jazz rock, progressive rock, experimental 20th century compositions, ambient music music-concrete, free-jazz, post-rock improvisation, experimental rap, and multicultural/trans-cultural experiments.

COMA produced its first live performance event in July 1983 at a small art gallery in Downtown Long Beach. The format of the concert would form the template of the Day of Music events: solo performers and small ensembles playing sequentially over several hours. In this case, the performances started at noon and ended at 10:00 PM. At the Day of Music events, which launched in 1988, events started at noon and ran until midnight. They took place in multiple venues in the Pine Avenue area of Downtown Long Beach, including the gallery-café-performance space System M, a restaurant called Mum’s, and multiple gallery spaces on Pine Avenue, Broadway, and Third Street in Downtown Long Beach. In 1985 the group produced a full-length LP on Rotary Totem Records called A Beginner’s Guide to COMA. This ten-song disc included music from a number of rock-leaning performers, including Dogma Probe, Elma Mayer, Tao Mao, The Underpeople, Mark Soden, The Motor Totemist Guild, Cartoon, Newcross, 5UUs, and Rhythm Plague.

The activities and impact of COMA have been documented in at least two research papers, Jarle Glesåen Storløkken’s COMA - American avant rock: a study of the music of avant rock bands and Charles Sharp’s book-length dissertation Improvisation, Identity, and Tradition: Experimental Music Communities in Los Angeles.

== Discography ==
A Beginner’s Guide to COMA 1985, Rotary Totem Records, RTR-LP-003

== Members and affiliates ==
- 5uu's
- Josh Adelson
- Ken Ando
- Bonnie Barnett
- Bazooka
- Guy Bennett
- Joseph Berardi
- Alex Cline
- Nels Cline
- Cruel Frederick
- Mike Demers
- Karl Denson
- Richard Derrick
- Tom Dougherty
- Brad Dutz
- False Dimitri
- Ken Filiano
- The Fnords
- Ron George
- Vinny Golia
- James Grigsby
- Richard Grossman
- Greg Harris
- Emily Hay
- Lynn Johnston
- Darrell Jónsson
- Jason Kahn
- Kaoru
- Dave Karasony
- Dave Kerman
- Elise Kermani
- Virtus Kerny
- Bob Mair
- Manufacturing of Humidifiers
- Goucho Marks
- Elma Mayer
- Dean Myerson
- NEEF
- Jim Nightingale
- Non Credo
- Jim Norman
- PFS
- Paper Bag
- Papa’s Midnight Hop
- Wayne Peet
- Bill Plake
- Eric Potruch
- David Poyourow
- Tim Quinn
- Rena
- John Reager
- Ken Rosser
- B.B. Russell
- Vicki Silbert
- Mark Soden
- G.E. Stinson
- Carl Stone
- SubMedia
- Tao Mao
- Horace Tapscott
- Ed Toomey
- Trio Search and Seizure
- Universal Congress Of
- Chuck Turner
- Michael Vlatkovich
- Kira Vollman
- Rich West
- Curt Wilson
- Brent Wilcox
- Walter Zooi

== Venues ==
- Club Lhasa
- Anti-Club
- Safari Sam's
- KXLU Radio
- Helen's Place
- System M/M Bar
- Mums
- James Armstrong Theatre
- KCRW Radio
- Art Matrix
- Long Beach Public Library Auditorium
- Hop Singh's
- Beyond Baroque Literary Arts Center
- KPFK Radio

== Press ==
- Goings On Santa Barbara A Humdinger; Day of Music features one event designed to bathe participants in sound. LEO SMITH. Los Angeles Times May 23, 1991
- GOINGS ON SANTA BARBARA Chalking It Up; Santa Barbara's Italian Street Painting Festival brings 200 artists and children to their knees. LEO SMITH. Los Angeles Times May 24, 1990. p. 16
- It's music, music, everywhere in Long Beach // PREVIEW: Day of Music organizer Moins Rastgar keeps the city grooving with a lineup of more than two dozen local groups. [MORNING Edition] BEN WENER: The Orange County Register. Orange County Register. Santa Ana, Calif.: Sep 29, 1995. p. 54
- Fusion fans might favor a triple-bill; [EVENING Edition] Anne Valdespino:The Orange County Register. Orange County Register. Santa Ana, Calif.: Sep 13, 1990. p. K.02
- Riffs; [EVENING Edition] Cary Darling:The Register. Orange County Register. Santa Ana, Calif.: Sep 10, 1989. p. L.22
- Riffs; [EVENING Edition] Cary Darling:The Register. Orange County Register. Santa Ana, Calif.: Oct 9, 1988. p. j.22
- CRITIC'S CHOICE: POP MUSIC; [EVENING Edition] Jim Washburn:The Register. Orange County Register. Santa Ana, Calif.: Mar 4, 1988. p. 37
- New Work Performed on New Instruments; Composer: Ron George plays his music on his own inventions... CHRIS PASLES TIMES STAFF WRITER June 1, 1990
