= The California Wine Club =

- Type: Private
- Industry: Retail (Wine)
- Founded: 1990
- Headquarters: Ventura, California, United States
- Key people: Bruce Boring, Co-Founder; Pam Boring, Co-Founder; Gerri Becker, President
- Products: Wine, wine club
- Website: www.cawineclub.com

The California Wine Club is a wine club co-founded in 1990 by Bruce and Pam Boring in Ventura, California and is considered one of the largest mail-order wine businesses in the United States. The company is now owned by Gold Medal Wine Group. The club offers hand-selected wines on a monthly basis from boutique and small, family-owned wineries in California, Oregon, Washington State, and other countries such as France, Italy, and Austria.

== Cork recycling program ==
The California Wine Club partnered with ReCork, a natural wine cork recycling program, in July 2011 to conduct a nationwide cork drive.

== Uncorked, The California Wine Club newsletter ==
Shipments from The California Wine Club include their newsletter, Uncorked. Uncorked is a full magazine featuring glossy pictures and articles. It also includes tasting notes for featured wines, interviews, recipes, and more.

== See also ==
- Wine clubs
- Wine tasting
- Aging of wine
- Aroma of wine
