= California Autism Foundation =

US non-profit organization

- Abbreviation: CAF
- Founded: October 5, 1982; 44 years ago
- Tax ID no.: 68-0149447
- Legal status: 501(c)(3) non-profit organization
- Headquarters: Richmond, California
- Executive Director: Valisha Fullard
- President: Mark Roberts
- Revenue: $6,380,514 (2014)
- Expenses: $6,096,168 (2014)
- Employees: 267 (2014)
- Website: www.calautism.org

California Autism Foundation (CAF) is a 501(c)(3) non-profit organization headquartered in Richmond, California.

CAF provides residential service, educational and vocational programs to clients with autism.

== History ==
In August 1983, CAP opened its first residential home in San Rafael, California, for adults with autism cases deemed too severe to live outside of an institution. Called A Better Chance (ABC), the CAF billed ABC as a "therapeutic and supportive environment" that is based on "tenets of human rights and respect".

In 2008, John Visbal became CEO of CAF and made plans for expansion. In 2013, John D. Rockefeller was named CEO.

== Programs ==
=== Educational and Social Programs ===
CAF claims to center around creating a sense of community and thus offers academic, recreational, environmental, and cultural activities that aim to foster personal development.

==== ABC School ====
ABC School is designed for children and young adults aged 6 to 22 diagnosed with autism or other developmental disabilities. The school builds on the California Autism Foundation's philosophy of community building and prioritizes teaching life skills through collaborative teaching principles and real-world training opportunities. ABC school also utilizes community job partners to provide vocational training and opportunities to its older students.

==== ABC Adult Day Program ====
The ABC Adult Day Program is a vocational training program for adults from 18 years of age or older with autism (or other developmental disabilities) to help these adults learn about acceptable social interactions. This program helps individuals with self-advocacy, self-care, vocational and community integration. This program can be carried out throughout group or individualized services in order to achieve the goals of their IPP, or Individual Program Plan.

The Program offers aid in everyday activities such as computer skills and hygiene. These skills can help develop these future employees and to overcome social adversity. These traits of self-care and self-reliance have helped many people with disabilities develop communication skills that "include P.E.C.S. and sign language that make them marketable to many companies."

Vocational and employment training helps prepare students by providing them with the tools to learn skills such as gardening and landscaping, janitorial services, and food packaging and distribution. This allows employees to work independently in the field in which they choose to study.

=== Employment Programs ===
People with disabilities are one of the largest groups of unemployed adults. These people face discrimination when it comes to training, accommodations and assistive technological services that make it possible for working disabled employees to obtain and excel in their industry. These people also face adversity when it comes to career opportunities. CAF has created programs that help individuals with disabilities gain skills to join the workforce and contribute to their community.

==== CAF Work Activity Program ====
The Work Activity Program allows participants to utilize these opportunities that are provided to build self-confidence and the feeling of accomplishment, productivity and independence.

==== Precision Industries ====
CAF focuses on the skill-sets possessed by an individual and how to develop these skills into desirable traits employers look for. This business division is called Precision Industries (PI). PI operates an on-site Custom Assembly and Packaging (CAP) business at CAF's Richmond facility.

Working with Precision Industries, individuals enrolled in the WAP program are employed by CAP and provide packaging, labeling and assembly services for a variety of businesses that have contracted with Precision Industries to perform their production fulfillment." This CAP Program gives employees a chance to earn an income, but to also secure possible future employment. The CAP Program provides on-site adult education classes that help develop employment skills.

==== Residential Programs ====
CAF Residential programs have been designed to coordinate social activities for individuals with disabilities. Throughout providing these services, residents can live in an environment that is accepting and designed to give them the opportunity to explore their potential.

==== ABC Residential Homes ====
CAF now owns three residential homes.

ABC homes are designed for adults ages 18 to 59 to provide them with social skills training in an environment that fosters individuality. Residents are urged to find their potential and given an opportunity to take the initiative to practice their own daily routine.
