= California Children's Services =

The California Children's Services (CCS) Program, established in 1927, is a partnership between state and counties that provides medical case management for children in California diagnosed with serious chronic diseases. It provides services to more than 165,000 children in California.

== History ==
Title V of the Social Security Act was passed in an effort to support states who pledged to improve child and maternal health and welfare. This act has been modified, but its goal of serving children and women has remained the same.

- Remains the only federal program that emphasizes the need of improving the health of children and mothers.
- Funds services that complement those provided through the state's medical assistance programs such as Medicaid and the State Children's Health Insurance Program (SCHIP).
- Three specific groups are targeted through the Title V block grant:
  - Pregnant women and infants less than 1 year of age;
  - Children between 1 and 21 years of age; and
  - Children with special health care needs (CSHCN).

About 15% of California's CSHCN receive specialty care through the CCS program. Nearly 150,000 children annually receive care through the CCS program and about 80% are Medi-Cal beneficiaries.

== Program Description ==
CCS is administered by Children's Medical Services in the Department of Health Services (DHCS). For providers to see patients covered by CCS, they must be approved by the state CCS program to be considered a CCS paneled provider.

CCS provides the following support services.

1. Assist in treatment costs related to the CCS condition. Such examples include doctor services, surgical costs, inpatient costs, medical equipment, physical therapy, and laboratory tests.
2. Medical Case Management. Given that these patients have very complex healthcare condition CCS has the ability to ensure that physicians from various specialties can provide the services to the child.
3. Medical Therapy Program (MTP) services that provide medically eligible children with physical therapy, occupational therapy or both.

=== Funding for CCS ===
For a county CCS program the funding source is a combination of appropriations from the county, state general funds and the federal government. California is required to spend 30% of funds from its Title V Maternal and Child Health Block Grant on children with special health care needs, thus a portion of these federal funds go to the CCS program. The amount of state money available for the program is determined every year through the Budget Act. AB 948 states that the state and county need to share the costs of providing services, such as these, to ill children.

Funding differs among those with CCS and other sources of financial assistance. Seventy percent of children that are eligible for CCS are also eligible for Medi-Cal. In this case, the Medi-Cal program reimburses their care. The other 30 percent of children account for those children who are CCS only and those that have Optional Targeted Low Income Children's Program (OTLICP) Through Medi-Cal. Funding for individuals with both CCS and OTLICP is mainly provided by the federal Title XXI, with state and county funds providing 30% of the costs. Costs for individuals with just CCS are paid between the state and counties.

Note that Insurance Code Sections 12693.62, 12693.64, and 12693.66—which address California's Healthy Families Program no longer pertain specifically to Healthy Families as Healthy Families was absorbed by Medi-Cal in 2013 under the OTLICP.

=== Program Structure ===
The way the program is administered is dependent on the size of the population in the county. For instance, in counties that are considered independent counties, those that have more than 200,000, individuals residing in that specific location, county staff are expected to play a vital role in evaluation, eligibility determination, and authorizations. For those counties with less than 200,000 individuals, also referred to as dependent counties, the Children's Medical Services Branch provides assistance with these procedures through its regional offices. Dependent counties make decisions on financial and residential eligibility and have direct contact with families. Some dependent counties have participated in the Case Management Improvement Project (CMIP) to partner with regional offices in determining medical eligibility and authorization of services. Regional offices also provide assistance to independent counties, CCS paneled providers, and hospitals in their region.

== Eligibility ==
Children, from birth to the age of twenty-one, are eligible for CCS if they meet the following medical, residential and financial eligibility

=== Medical Requirements ===
Eligible conditions include, but are not limited to:

- Birth defects,
- HIV/AIDS,
- Cystic fibrosis,
- Blood disorders such as hemophilia,
- Cerebral palsy,
- Heart disease, and
- Cancer.

All conditions covered by CCS tend to produce major long-term effects.

=== Residential Requirements ===
To be covered by CCS children must be residents of California.

=== Financial Requirements ===
Children are eligible if they are:

1. Enrolled in Medi-Cal or Optional Targeted Low Income Children"s Program (OTLICP) through Medi-Cal;
2. Uninsured and annual family income less than $40,000; or
3. The child's condition requires expenditures projected to exceed 20% of the family's annual adjusted gross income.

Note that children with neuromuscular or orthopedic problems like cerebral palsy need not meet financial eligibility requirements to access services under the MTP.

== Impact ==
Analysis of CCS claims of 2009 showed that about 16% of children enrolled in CCS are less than one year of age and the majority of children at 28% were ages 1 to 4. For children under the age of one the leading diagnoses were heart conditions. For children greater than 1 year of age the most common condition was neurological disorders.

== The Future of CCS ==
For California to change the way it delivers Medi-Cal services, the federal government must grant permission in the form of a waiver. A 1115 Waiver approved in November 2010 affects children eligible to receive CCS health care needs through demonstration pilots. Demonstration pilots under the Department of Health Care Services test new models for healthcare delivery among this population of CCS children.
