= California Low Cost Auto Insurance Program =

Agency overview
- Jurisdiction: Government of California
- Website: www.mylowcostauto.com

The State of California has in existence an automobile Liability insurance program (LCA) that assists people whose income is below a certain level to purchase insurance at greatly reduced rates. The objective is to give all residents of California the opportunity to be insured by providing affordable options.

When you apply for the program, you have to meet certain income requirements. As an example, a single person cannot have income that exceeds an amount over 250% of the poverty level. Most states in the contiguous U.S. have a program like LCA.

The rates, or premiums, vary by county in the State of California. The down payment is 15% of the nominal premium. The payments are bi-monthly (every other month), and the remaining balance is divided into six installments.

Details on the LCA program can be found on the CA DMV website.
