= California Reading List =

The California Reading List is a literature database designed to help pupils identify age appropriate and challenging reading material based on their standardized test scores. Each pupils recommended list is delivered as part of the results notification for the California Standardized Testing and Reporting exams as a number between 1 and 13. In conjunction with the pupils grade level, an age appropriate recommended reading list is presented.

== See also ==
- California High School Exit Exam
