= California Alpine Club =

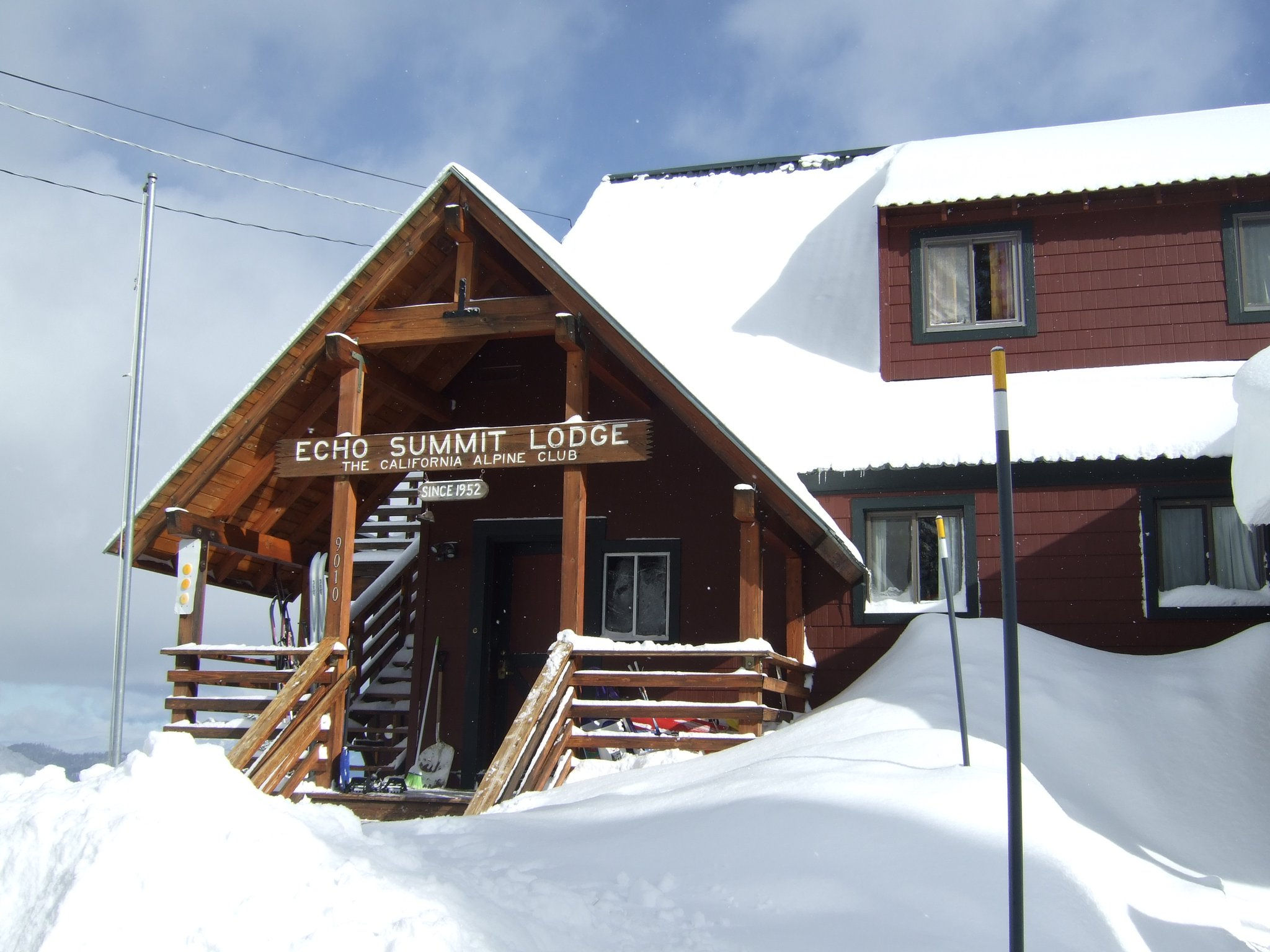
Echo Summit Lodge, south rim of Lake Tahoe Basin

The California Alpine Club (CAC) is an all-volunteer, outdoors-oriented social group centered in the San Francisco Bay and Sacramento areas that organizes hiking, skiing, member dinners, and wilderness trips. Club members also manage the California Alpine Club Foundation, which gives grants to California-based wilderness preservation, conservation, outdoor recreation, and education projects.

CAC owns and runs two rustic lodges for members and their guests, the Alpine Lodge on Mount Tamalpais in Marin County, California, just north of San Francisco, and the Echo Summit Lodge in Echo Lake, on the south rim of the Lake Tahoe basin. Both lodges are ADA compliant, have kitchens, private bedrooms, and dormitories available to members for private accommodations, weddings, business meetings, and family reunions.

Echo Summit is a large mountain lodge in the Sierra Nevada (elevation 7,365 feet) commanding a view of Lake Tahoe and surrounding mountains, on the Pacific Crest Trail. Almost 64,000 acres of rugged granite peaks and the alpine lakes of Desolation Wilderness Area are within easy walking distance, and Echo Lake—a mile from the lodge—offers swimming, fishing, and boating. In winter, the area is used for alpine skiing and cross-country ski touring, as well as sledding, snowshoeing and other backcountry snow sports. Nearby well-known ski areas include Heavenly Valley, Sierra at Tahoe, and Kirkwood.

The Club was established in 1913 through the efforts of a YMCA hiking group after The San Francisco Call Bulletin ran a series of articles encouraging more people to join the Sunday morning hikes on Mount Tamalpais. At that time, Mount Tamalpais was at its height as a recreation destination. The 1910s and 20's drew many visitors to local attractions like the mountaintop Tamalpais Tavern and the Mt. Tamalpais & Muir Woods Railway, known as "The Crookedest Railroad in the World”. Alpine Lodge was accessible from San Francisco by a Sausalito Ferry, then by a small-rail train to the Mill Valley, CA station at the foot of Mount Tamalpais. The Golden Gate Bridge for automobiles opened in May 1937, greatly increasing accessibility to the wilderness environs of Mount Tamalpais.

Many of CAC's early members were instrumental in establishing other currently active civic events and associations, such as the annual Mountain Play, the Mount Tamalpais outdoor theater, and the Western Federation of Outdoor Clubs. The club was incorporated as a non-profit 501(c)(7) corporation in 1936.

The Friends of Mt. Tam and the Sierra Club of California are among those organizations that regularly use the lodge for meetings or overnight stays. Echo Summit Lodge is host to annual meetings and members of the Tahoe Rim Trail and Pacific Crest Trail associations, as well as a year-round destination for CAC members to hike, backpack, and explore the Desolation Valley Wilderness and enjoy winter-time attractions such as sledding, snowshoeing, and cross-country and downhill skiing.

In order to maintain family-friendly dues, members are expected to contribute to club operations in some way at least once a year. Membership was about 650 as of December, 2013.
