= California Complete Count Committee =

The California Complete Count Committee (Committee) is both appointed by the California governor and charged to develop and implement a statewide outreach and awareness campaign to ensure all Californians are counted in the decennial census. Complete Count Committees establish a partnership with the US Census Bureau. More than $435 billion is distributed to states on the basis in whole, or in part, on census data.

== History ==
The committee was first created after a large undercount was found in California after the 1990 decennial census. It is estimated that because of the undercount, California lost billions of dollars in federal resources and congressional representation.

== 2000 California Complete Count Committee ==
The 2000 California Complete Count Committee included 18 statewide leaders and was created by Executive Order D-11-99 by Governor Grey Davis. The committee was allocated $24.7 million through Senate Bill 711 to conduct a first of its kind statewide outreach campaign. In 2000 the United States United States Census Bureau estimated California's mail back response rate to be the same as that of 1990, 58%. California attained a 70% mail back response rate, which was 2-3% above the national average United States Census Bureau: 2000 Mail Back Response Rates.

Analysis shows that the 2000 California Complete Count Committee increased the mail back response rate by up to 8% where the Committee focused its efforts. This multi-lingual, multi-media advertising and outreach campaign was the first to coin the term “trusted messengers” as a key strategy to reach undercounted populations.

== 2010 California Complete Count Committee ==
In 2009, Governor Arnold Schwarzenegger created a California Complete Count Committee for the 2010 decennial census by Executive Order S-10-09. The committee is composed of 52 members representing public office, community-based organizations and business. The Executive Order prescribes that the Committee focus its outreach on Hard-to-Count regions and traditionally Hard-to-Count groups, like men ages 18–25 or children.

== Hard-to-Count and Population in California ==
California's Hard-to-Count scores higher than the national average with groups that are "linguistically isolated" or live in "overcrowded units".

California obtains 10 of the top 50 Hard-to-Count Counties in the nation, including the number 1 Hard-To-Count County: Los Angeles.

With approximately 12% of the nation's population, California has more than 30% of the Hard-to-Count populations in the nation.

== See also ==
- Census
