= List of professional sports teams in California =

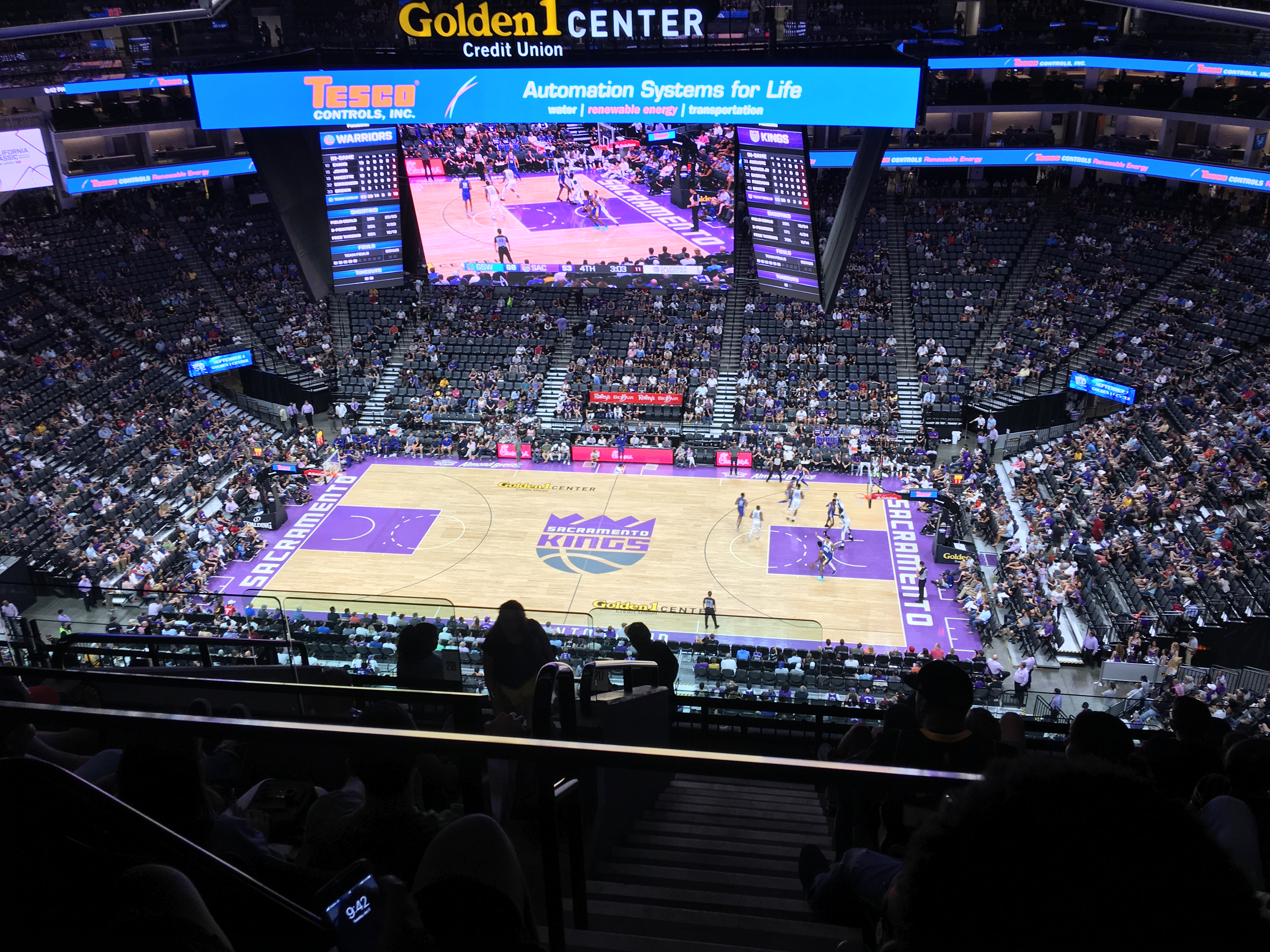
The Sacramento Kings of the NBA (shown playing at Golden 1 Center in Sacramento) are one of two major professional sports teams in the state's capital.

There are many professional sports teams based in California, participating in sports such as baseball, American football, soccer, basketball, ice hockey, lacrosse, and ultimate.

== Major men's professional sports teams ==
=== National Hockey League ===
==== Anaheim Ducks ====
based in Anaheim (Main article)

- Expansion team in 1993
- Previously known as the Mighty Ducks of Anaheim (1993–2006)
- Play at Honda Center (1993–present)
- No previous arenas (Honda Center was formerly known as Arrowhead Pond of Anaheim)
- Stanley Cup Championships: 2007

==== Los Angeles Kings ====
based in Los Angeles (Main article)

- Expansion team in 1967
- No previous monikers
- Play at Crypto.com Arena (1999–present) (Crypto.com Arena was formerly known as Staples Center)
- Previously played at Long Beach Arena (1967), Los Angeles Memorial Sports Arena (1967), The Forum (1967–1999)
- Stanley Cup Championships: 2012, 2014

==== San Jose Sharks ====
based in San Jose (Main article)

- Expansion team in 1991
- No previous monikers
- Play at SAP Center at San Jose (1993–present)
- Previously played at Cow Palace (1991–1993)
- Stanley Cup Championships: None

=== Major League Baseball ===
==== Los Angeles Angels ====
based in Anaheim (Main article)

- Expansion team in 1961
- Previously known as the Los Angeles Angels (1961–1965), California Angels (1965–1996), Anaheim Angels (1997–2004), and Los Angeles Angels of Anaheim (2005–2015)
- Play at Angel Stadium of Anaheim (1966–present)
- Previously played at Wrigley Field (1961) and Dodger Stadium (1961–1965)
- World Series Championships: 2002

==== Los Angeles Dodgers ====
based in Los Angeles (Main article)

- Relocated from Brooklyn in 1958
- Previously known as the Brooklyn Dodgers (1932–1957) and others (1883–1931)
- Play at Dodger Stadium (1962–present)
- Previously played at Ebbets Field (1913–1957), Los Angeles Memorial Coliseum (1958–1961), and others (1883–1912)
- World Series Championships: (Note: Only includes championships won while playing in California) 1959, 1963, 1965, 1981, 1988, 2020, 2024, 2025

==== San Diego Padres ====
based in San Diego (Main article)

- Expansion team in 1969
- No previous monikers
- Play at Petco Park (2004–present)
- Previously played at San Diego Stadium (1969–2003)
- World Series Championships: None

==== San Francisco Giants ====
based in San Francisco (Main article)

- Relocated from New York City in 1958
- Previously known as the New York Gothams (1883–1885) and New York Giants (1885–1958)
- Play at Oracle Park (2000–present)
- Previously played at the New York Polo Grounds (1911–1957), Seals Stadium (1958–1959), Candlestick Park (1960–1999), and others (1883–1910)
- World Series Championships: 2010, 2012, 2014

==== Athletics ====
based in West Sacramento (Main article)

- Relocated from Oakland in 2025
- Previously known as the Oakland Athletics (1968–2024)
- Previously known as the Kansas City Athletics (1955–1967)
- Previously known as the Philadelphia Athletics (1901–1954)
- Play at Sutter Health Park (2025-present)
- Previously played at the Oakland Coliseum (1968–2024), Municipal Stadium (1955–1967), Shibe Park (1909–1954) , Columbia Park (1901–1908)
- World Series Championships: 1972, 1973, 1974, 1989

=== National Football League ===
==== Los Angeles Chargers ====
play in Inglewood; headquarters in Costa Mesa (Main article)

- Expansion team in 1960, played in San Diego from 1961 to 2016
- Previously known as the San Diego Chargers (1961–2016)
- Play at SoFi Stadium (2020–present)
- Previously played at Los Angeles Memorial Coliseum (1960), Balboa Stadium (1961–1966), San Diego Stadium (1967–2016), and Dignity Health Sports Park (2017–2019)
- Championships: 1963

==== Los Angeles Rams ====
play in Inglewood; headquarters in Agoura Hills (Main article)

- Expansion team in 1936, played in Cleveland from 1936 to 1945 and St. Louis from 1995 to 2015
- Previously known as the Cleveland Rams (1936–1945) and St. Louis Rams (1995–2015)
- Play at SoFi Stadium (2020–present)
- Previously played at Cleveland Stadium (1936–1937, 1939–1941), League Park (1937, 1942, 1944–1945), Shaw Stadium (1938), Los Angeles Memorial Coliseum (1946–1979, 2016–2019), Anaheim Stadium (1980–1994), Busch Memorial Stadium (1995), and Edward Jones Dome (1995–2015)
- Championships: 1951, 2021 (LVI)

==== San Francisco 49ers ====
based in Santa Clara (stadium and HQ) (Main article)

- Expansion team in 1946 (AAFC), joined NFL in 1950
- No previous moniker
- Play at Levi's Stadium (2014–present)
- Previously played at Kezar Stadium (1946–1970) and Candlestick Park (1971–2013)
- Championships: 1981 (XVI), 1984 (XIX), 1988 (XXIII), 1989 (XXIV), 1994 (XXIX)

=== National Basketball Association ===
==== Golden State Warriors ====
based in San Francisco (Main article)

- Relocated from Philadelphia in 1962
- Previously known as the Philadelphia Warriors (1946–1962) and San Francisco Warriors (1962–1971)
- Play at Chase Center (2019–present).
- Previously played at Cow Palace (1962–64, 1966–71), San Francisco Civic Auditorium (1964–67), USF War Memorial Gymnasium (1964–66), HP Pavilion at San Jose (1996–1997), Oracle Arena (1966–1967, 1971–1996 and 1997–2019), and others (1946–1962)
- NBA Championships: 1975, 2015, 2017, 2018, 2022

==== Los Angeles Clippers ====
based in Los Angeles (Main article)

- Relocated from Buffalo in 1978 to San Diego, then relocated to Los Angeles in 1984
- Previously known as the Buffalo Braves (1970–1978) and San Diego Clippers (1978–1984)
- Play at Intuit Dome (2024–present)
- Previously played at Buffalo Memorial Auditorium (1970–1978), San Diego Sports Arena (1978–1984), Los Angeles Memorial Sports Arena (1984–1999), Honda Center (1994–1999) and Crypto.com Arena (1999-2024)
- NBA Championships: None

==== Los Angeles Lakers ====
based in Los Angeles (Main article)

- Relocated from Minnesota in 1960
- Previously known as the Detroit Gems (1946–1947) and Minneapolis Lakers (1947–1960)
- Play at Crypto.com Arena (1999–present)
- Previously played at Minneapolis Auditorium (1947–1960), Los Angeles Memorial Sports Arena (1960–1967), The Forum (1967–1999)
- NBA Championships: 1972, 1980, 1982, 1985, 1987, 1988, 2000, 2001, 2002, 2009, 2010, 2020

==== Sacramento Kings ====
based in Sacramento (Main article)

- Relocated from Kansas City in 1985
- Previously known as the Rochester Royals (1945–1957), Cincinnati Royals (1957–1972), Kansas City-Omaha Kings (1972–1975), Kansas City Kings (1975–1985)
- Play at the Golden 1 Center (2016–present)
- Previously played at Kansas City Municipal Auditorium (1972–1974) Omaha Civic Auditorium (1972–1978), Kemper Arena (1974–1985), ARCO Arena I (1985–1988), Sleep Train Arena (1988–2016; also known as ARCO Arena and Power Balance Pavilion) (and others) (1945–1972)
- NBA Championships: None

=== Major League Soccer ===
==== LA Galaxy ====
based in Carson (Main article)

- Original team in league's 1996 inaugural season
- No previous monikers
- Play at Dignity Health Sports Park (2003–present)(Dignity Health Sports Park was formerly known as The Home Depot Center)
- Previously played at Rose Bowl (1996–2002) plus Titan Stadium select home games
- Championships: MLS Cup 6 (2002, 2005, 2011, 2012, 2014, 2024) Supporters' Shield (1998, 2002, 2010, 2011), Lamar Hunt U.S. Open Cup (2001, 2005), CONCACAF Champions Cup (2000)

==== Los Angeles FC ====
based in Los Angeles (Main article)

- Expansion team in 2018
- No previous monikers
- Play at BMO Stadium (2018–present)
- No previous stadiums
- Championships: MLS Cup (2022); Supporters' Shield (2019, 2022), Lamar Hunt U.S. Open Cup (2024)

==== San Jose Earthquakes ====
based in San Jose (Main article)

- Original team in league's 1996 inaugural season
- Previously known as the San Jose Clash (1996–1999)
- Franchise on hiatus in the 2006 and 2007 seasons; the original ownership relocated the team to Houston after the 2005 season as the Houston Dynamo, but MLS kept the name and history of the original franchise in San Jose for a new ownership group
- Play at PayPal Park (2015–present), plus other venues for select games
- Previously played at Spartan Stadium (1996–2005), Buck Shaw Stadium (2008–2014), and other venues for select games
- Championships: MLS Cup (2001, 2003), Supporters' Shield (2005, 2012)

==== San Diego FC ====
based in San Diego (Main article)

- Expansion team to begin play in 2025
- No previous monikers
- Play at Snapdragon Stadium (2025–present)
- Championships: None

== Major women's professional sports teams ==
=== Women's National Basketball Association ===
==== Golden State Valkyries ====
based in San Francisco (Main article)

- Expansion team in 2025
- No previous monikers
- Play at Chase Center (2025–present)
- No previous stadiums
- Championships: 2026

==== Los Angeles Sparks ====
based in Los Angeles (Main article)

- Inaugural WNBA team in 1997
- No previous monikers
- Play at Crypto.com Arena (2001–present)
- Previously played at The Forum (1997–2000)
- Championships: 2001, 2002, 2016

=== National Women's Soccer League ===
==== Angel City FC ====
based in Los Angeles (Main article)

- Expansion team in 2022
- No previous monikers
- Play at BMO Stadium (2022–present), plus Titan Stadium (2022–present) for NWSL Challenge Cup home matches
- No previous stadiums
- Championships: None

==== San Diego Wave FC ====
based in San Diego (Main article)

- Expansion team in 2022
- No previous monikers
- Play at Snapdragon Stadium (2022–present)
- Previously played at Torero Stadium (2022 – first 9 home games)
- Championships: None

==== Bay FC ====
based in San Jose (Main article)

- Expansion team in 2024
- No previous monikers
- Play at PayPal Park (2024–present)
- No previous stadiums
- Championships: None

=== Professional Women's Hockey League ===
==== San Jose Sea Lions ====
- Based in San Jose
- Expansion team in 2026

== Other professional sports teams ==
Sport	League	Team	City
Baseball	California League (Low-A MiLB)	Fresno Grizzlies	Fresno
Baseball	California League (Low-A MiLB)	Inland Empire 66ers	San Bernardino
Baseball	California League (Low-A MiLB)	Lake Elsinore Storm	Lake Elsinore
Baseball	California League (Low-A MiLB)	Ontario Tower Buzzers formerly Modesto Nuts	Ontario formerly Modesto
Baseball	California League (Low-A MiLB)	Rancho Cucamonga Quakes	Rancho Cucamonga
Baseball	California League (Low-A MiLB)	San Jose Giants	San Jose
Baseball	California League (Low-A MiLB)	Stockton Ports	Stockton
Baseball	California League (Low-A MiLB)	Visalia Rawhide	Visalia
Baseball	Pacific Association	Napa Silverados	Napa
Baseball	Pacific Association	Sonoma Stompers	Sonoma
Baseball	Pacific Association	Vallejo Admirals	Vallejo
Baseball	Pacific Coast League (Triple-A MiLB)	Sacramento River Cats	West Sacramento
Basketball	American Basketball Association	California Golden Tigers	Oakland
Basketball	American Basketball Association	California Sea-Kings	Marina
Basketball	American Basketball Association	Modesto Super Kats	Modesto
Basketball	American Basketball Association	Oceanside A-Team	Oceanside
Basketball	American Basketball Association	Orange County Novastars	Irvine
Basketball	NBA G League	San Diego Clippers	San Diego
Basketball	NBA G League	Santa Cruz Warriors	Santa Cruz
Basketball	NBA G League	South Bay Lakers	El Segundo
Basketball	NBA G League	Stockton Kings	Stockton
Ice hockey	American Hockey League	Bakersfield Condors	Bakersfield
Ice hockey	American Hockey League	Coachella Valley Firebirds	Palm Desert
Ice hockey	American Hockey League	Ontario Reign	Ontario
Ice hockey	American Hockey League	San Diego Gulls	San Diego
Ice hockey	American Hockey League	San Jose Barracuda	Santa Clara
Soccer	USL Championship	Monterey Bay FC	Seaside
Soccer	USL Championship	Oakland Roots SC	Oakland
Soccer	USL Championship	Orange County SC	Irvine
Soccer	USL Championship	Sacramento Republic FC	Sacramento
Soccer	USL Championship	Temecula FC Quails	Temecula
Soccer	MLS Next Pro	LA Galaxy II	Carson
Soccer	MLS Next Pro	Los Angeles FC 2	Fullerton
Soccer	MLS Next Pro	San Jose Earthquakes II	Santa Clara
Soccer	USL League One	Central Valley Fuego FC	Fresno
Soccer	NISA	Albion San Diego	Chula Vista
Soccer	NISA	Bay Cities FC	Redwood City
Soccer	NISA	California United Strikers FC	Irvine
Soccer	NISA	Los Angeles Force	Los Angeles
Soccer	NISA	Oaks FC (Note: Plans to start play in 2024.)	Thousand Oaks
Soccer	Major Arena Soccer League	Ontario Fury	Ontario
Soccer	Major Arena Soccer League	San Diego Sockers	Escondido
Ultimate	Ultimate Frisbee Association	Los Angeles Aviators	Van Nuys
Ultimate	Ultimate Frisbee Association	San Diego Growlers	San Diego area
Ultimate	Ultimate Frisbee Association	Oakland Spiders	San Francisco Bay Area
Ultimate	Western Ultimate League	Los Angeles Astra	Los Angeles
Ultimate	Western Ultimate League	San Diego Superbloom	San Diego
Ultimate	Western Ultimate League	San Francisco Falcons	San Francisco
Rugby union	Major League Rugby	LA Giltinis	East Los Angeles
Rugby union	Major League Rugby	San Diego Legion	San Marcos

== See also ==
- Sports in California
