= 2024 in California =

- Decades: 2000s; 2010s; 2020s
- See also: History of California; Historical outline of California; List of years in California; 2024 in the United States

The year 2024 involved several major events in California.

== Incumbents ==
- Governor: Gavin Newsom (D)
- Lieutenant Governor: Eleni Kounalakis (D)
- Chief Justice: Patricia Guerrero (D)
- Senate president pro tempore: Toni Atkins (D) (until February 5), Mike McGuire (D) (starting February 5)
- Speaker of the Assembly: Robert A. Rivas (D)

== Demographics ==
The population of California on January 1, 2024, was estimated to be 39,128,186, according to the California Department of Finance. The population increased by 67,024 from 2023, the first rise in population since 2020. The Los Angeles Times attributed the increase to changes in domestic migration across states, a decrease in deaths to pre-COVID-19 pandemic levels, and U.S. president Joe Biden's immigration policies.

== Conflicts ==
Pro-Palestinian protests occurred at California universities. In April, California State Polytechnic University, Humboldt closed its campus for the remainder of the semester.

== Culture ==
=== Architecture ===
The May Lee State Office Complex, the largest office complex in the state, opened in Sacramento in May.

=== Media ===
The Los Angeles Times reduced its newsroom by twenty percent in an effort to reduce losses.

=== Sports ===
In the 2023 NFL season, the Los Angeles Rams advanced to the Wild Card playoffs and the San Francisco 49ers advanced to the divisional playoffs. The Rams lost to the Detroit Lions 24–23, securing the Lions's first playoff win since 1992. In the NFC Championship Game, the 49ers defeated the Lions 34–33, allowing the 49ers to face the Kansas City Chiefs in Super Bowl LVIII. The Chiefs defeated the 49ers 25–22, becoming the first team to consecutively win the Super Bowl since the New England Patriots in Super Bowl XXXIX.

In March, Ippei Mizuhara, the interpreter for Los Angeles Dodgers designated hitter Shohei Ohtani, was accused of using Ohtani's funds to place bets with a bookmaker who is the subject of a federal investigation.

== Economy ==
Significant layoffs in the technology sector as a consequence of growth during the COVID-19 pandemic continued into 2024. In January, Unity Technologies laid off 1,800 employees—or a quarter of its workforce, Amazon's live streaming service Twitch laid off 500 employees—or 35% of its workforce, and Google laid off hundreds of employees in its engineering, voice assistant, and hardware divisions that month.

== Environment and weather ==
A heat wave in the Western United States that began in July resulted in several fatalities, record temperatures, and wildfires. According to Fremont city officials, temperatures incurred a fish die-off in Lake Elizabeth.

== Health ==
The COVID-19 pandemic continued for a fourth year in California. In January, the California Department of Public Health revised its guidance to allow children who test positive for COVID-19 to return to school and reduced the timespan for isolation. A sublineage of COVID-19, FLiRT, contributed to an increase in COVID-19 cases in May. According to a report released by the Centers for Disease Control and Prevention, California had "very high" coronavirus levels in wastewater in July.

== Politics and law ==
=== National politics ===
In December 2023, California secretary of state Shirley Weber ruled that Donald Trump was eligible to be on the ballot in the 2024 presidential election. In July 2024, Joe Biden, the president of the United States since 2021, concluded his presidential campaign, endorsing Kamala Harris, the vice president of the United States since 2021 and a former California attorney general.

=== Law ===
A law prohibiting the concealed carry of firearms in most public places took effect on January 1, 2024, after the Court of Appeals for the Ninth Circuit paused an injunction District Court for the Central District of California judge Cormac J. Carney implemented in December 2023. The Ninth Circuit ruled on January 7 that the law could not proceed.

== Events ==
=== January ===
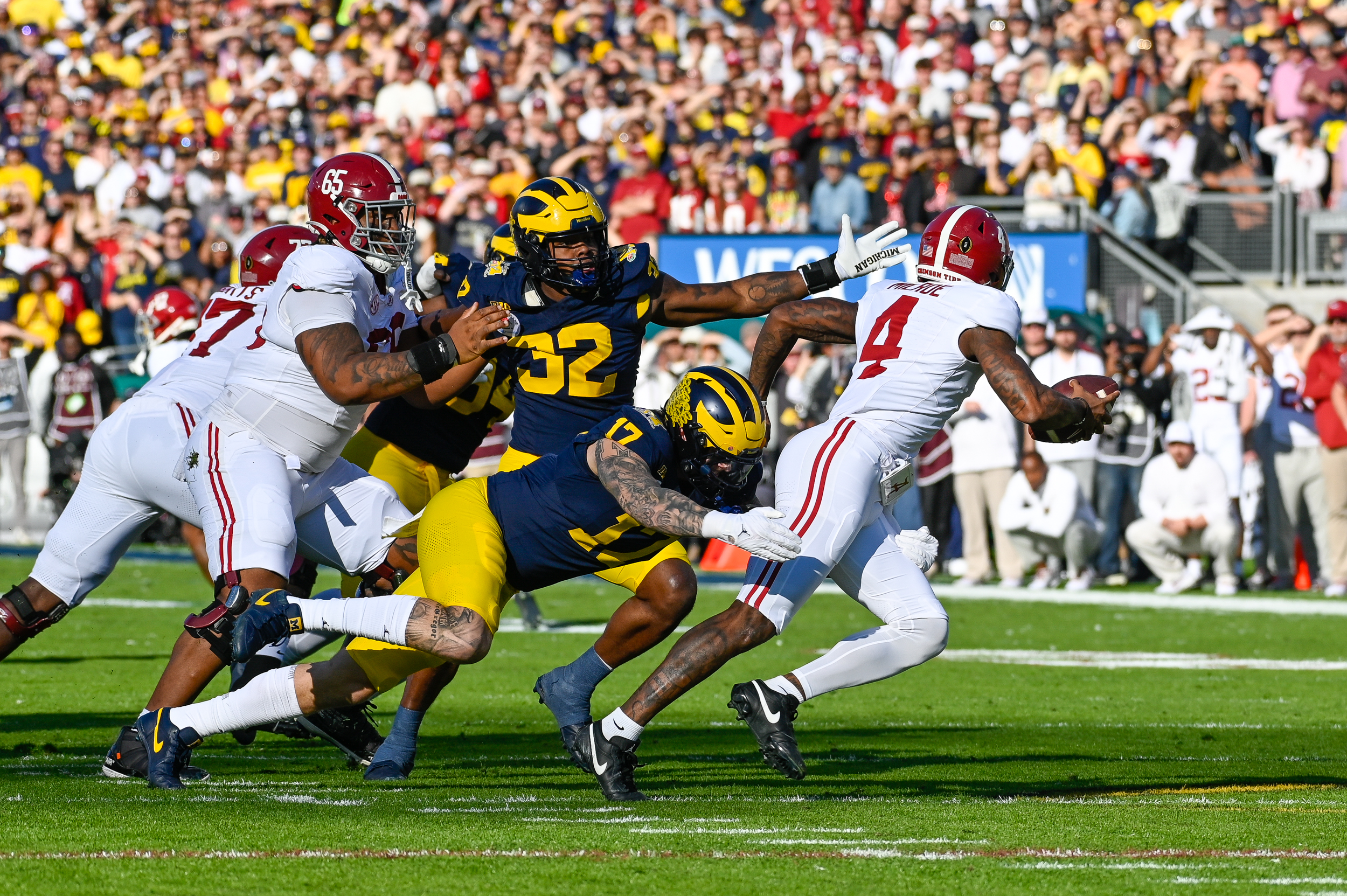
The 2024 Rose Bowl in Pasadena

- January 1:
  - Two people are killed and eight are injured in a mass shooting at a New Year's Eve celebration in downtown Los Angeles.
  - A law goes into effect setting the statewide minimum wage at US$16 per hour, the second-highest statewide minimum wage behind Washington.
- January 2 – 2024 Rose Bowl: The Michigan Wolverines defeat the Alabama Crimson Tide 27-20 in overtime, winning their first Rose Bowl title since 1998.
- January 3 – The California State Assembly session is halted after hundreds of protesters enter the State Capitol in Sacramento to call for a ceasefire in the Gaza war.
- January 7:
  - A vehicle pileup on Interstate 5 leaves two dead and nine injured.
  - 81st Golden Globe Awards: Oppenheimer wins five awards, including Best Motion Picture – Drama and Best Director for Christopher Nolan, and Succession wins four awards, including Best Television Series – Drama.
- January 9 – The Los Angeles Times appoints Terry Tang as its interim executive editor, the first woman to lead the publication, after Kevin Merida resigns.
- January 12 – Los Angeles Police Department chief Michel Moore announces he will resign at the end of February.
- January 15 – 75th Primetime Emmy Awards: The Bear and Succession win six awards, including Best Comedy Series and Best Drama Series, respectively.
- January 22 – The California Faculty Association begins a five-day strike, canceling classes at California State University campuses.
- January 29 – Five people are arrested in connection with the killing of six people in the Mojave Desert.

=== February ===
- February 1 – February 2024 California atmospheric river: A category five atmospheric river begins forming in California.
- February 6 – Five Marines die in a helicopter crash involving a Sikorsky CH-53E Super Stallion in San Diego.
- February 9 – Orbic Air Eurocopter EC130 crash: A Eurocopter EC130 helicopter crashes near the California–Nevada border, killing all six passengers, including Nigerian businessmen Herbert Wigwe and Abimbola Ogunbanjo.
- February 11 – A spree shooting takes place across Los Angeles County, killing four and injuring one. The three perpetrators are reported gang members.
- February 15 – Nine firefighters are injured in an explosion in Wilmington, Los Angeles.
- February 17– The city of San Bernardino settles a $4 million lawsuit after police officers were implicated in the Killing of Rob Marquise Adams in 2022.
- February 26 – Rescue California begins planning to recall Governor Gavin Newsom.

=== March ===
- March 3:
  - Four deputies are shot and wounded following a chase in Santa Rosa, and a suspect is killed.
  - 2024 King City shooting: Six people are killed and seven others are wounded in a gang-related mass shooting in King City.
- March 5:
  - Proposition 1 is voted on to reform the California Mental Health Services Act and establish a US$6.4 billion bond for new behavioral health beds.
  - 2024 California Republican presidential primary and 2024 California Democratic presidential primary: Former president Donald Trump wins the Republican presidential primary and president Joe Biden wins the Democratic presidential primary.
- March 7 – A Boeing 777-200 departing from San Francisco International Airport lands at Los Angeles International Airport after losing a wheel during takeoff, damaging several vehicles in an employee parking lot.
- March 10 – 96th Academy Awards: Christopher Nolan's Oppenheimer leads the nominations with thirteen, winning seven, including Best Picture, Best Director for Nolan, Best Actor for Cillian Murphy, and Best Supporting Actor for Robert Downey Jr.
- March 13:
  - Sixteen SWAT members are injured in an explosion at a training facility in Irvine.
  - Los Angeles Opera director James Conlon announces his retirement in 2026.
- March 14 – San Francisco Symphony director Esa-Pekka Salonen announces his resignation in 2025 over a dispute with the board of governors.
- March 16 – An allegedly speeding driver crashed into a bus stop in West Portal, San Francisco, killing four people, including two toddlers. She was arrested afterward.
- March 20 – After fifteen days of tallying mail-in ballots, Proposition 1 passes.
- March 21 – San Francisco-based social media service Reddit files for an initial public offering at a share price of US$34, valuing the company at US$6.4 billion.
- March 22 – The Department of Justice files an antitrust case against Apple Inc.
- March 25 – Sean Combs sexual misconduct allegations: The Department of Homeland Security searches rapper Sean Combs's Los Angeles home.

=== April ===
- April 3 – Thieves steal US$30 million from a storage facility in Sylmar, in one of the largest heists in Los Angeles history.
- April 15:
  - The Federal Correctional Institution, Dublin is ordered to close after allegations of sexual abuse.
  - Demonstrators protesting the Gaza war and United States support for Israel in the war block the Golden Gate Bridge and segments of Interstate 880.
- April 20 – Fifteen people are injured in an accident at Universal Studios Hollywood.
- April 21 – A suspect is arrested in connection with a break-in at the residence of Los Angeles mayor Karen Bass.
- April 24:
  - Pro-Palestinian protests on university campuses: The Los Angeles Police Department arrests 93 University of Southern California students protesting the Gaza war.
  - The Heisman Trust returns Reggie Bush's Heisman Trophy.
- April 25 – The University of Southern California cancels its main commencement ceremony.
- April 30:
  - A Los Angeles Metro train and bus collide, injuring 55 people.
  - Independent presidential candidate Robert F. Kennedy Jr. qualifies for the California ballot after the American Independent Party nominates him.

=== May ===
- May 1 – University of California, Los Angeles pro-Palestinian campus occupation: Fifteen people are injured in a violent counterprotest against a campus occupation at the University of California, Los Angeles.
- May 20 – University of California academic workers' strike: Workers at the University of California, Santa Cruz go on strike over the University of California's response to the University of California, Los Angeles pro-Palestinian campus occupation.
- May 21 – California's 20th congressional district special election: California's 20th congressional district elects Republican assemblyman Vince Fong in a special election following the resignation of Kevin McCarthy.
- May 31 – Thirty children and one adult at Portola Elementary School in San Bruno fall ill from tear gas at a nearby police training facility.

=== June ===
- June 6 – The California Supreme Court rules in favor of the University of California, Berkeley, allowing the university to construct housing at People's Park.
- June 15 – California wildfires: The Post Fire begins burning, the year's second major wildfire.
- June 18 – The Los Angeles Unified School District votes to ban smartphone use for students in class.
- June 20:
  - The Federal Bureau of Investigation raids the home of Oakland mayor Sheng Thao.
  - The Supreme Court rejects the Taxpayer Protection and Government Accountability Act, a proposed ballot measure.
- June 22 – Governor Gavin Newsom reaches an agreement with the California Democratic Party to resolve the budget deficit, cutting US$16 billion in spending and declaring a fiscal emergency.
- June 23 – Violence occurs between pro-Palestinian protesters and pro-Israeli counter-protesters outside the Adas Torah synagogue in Los Angeles. as sixty Los Angeles Police Department officers are deployed.
- June 25:
  - Fresno Police Department chief Paco Balderrama resigns during an investigation regarding an alleged affair with an officer's wife.
  - Waymo expands its driverless robotaxi service in San Francisco, removing its waitlist.
  - Gavin Newsom gives his State of the State address, criticizing Republicans in the broader United States.

=== July ===
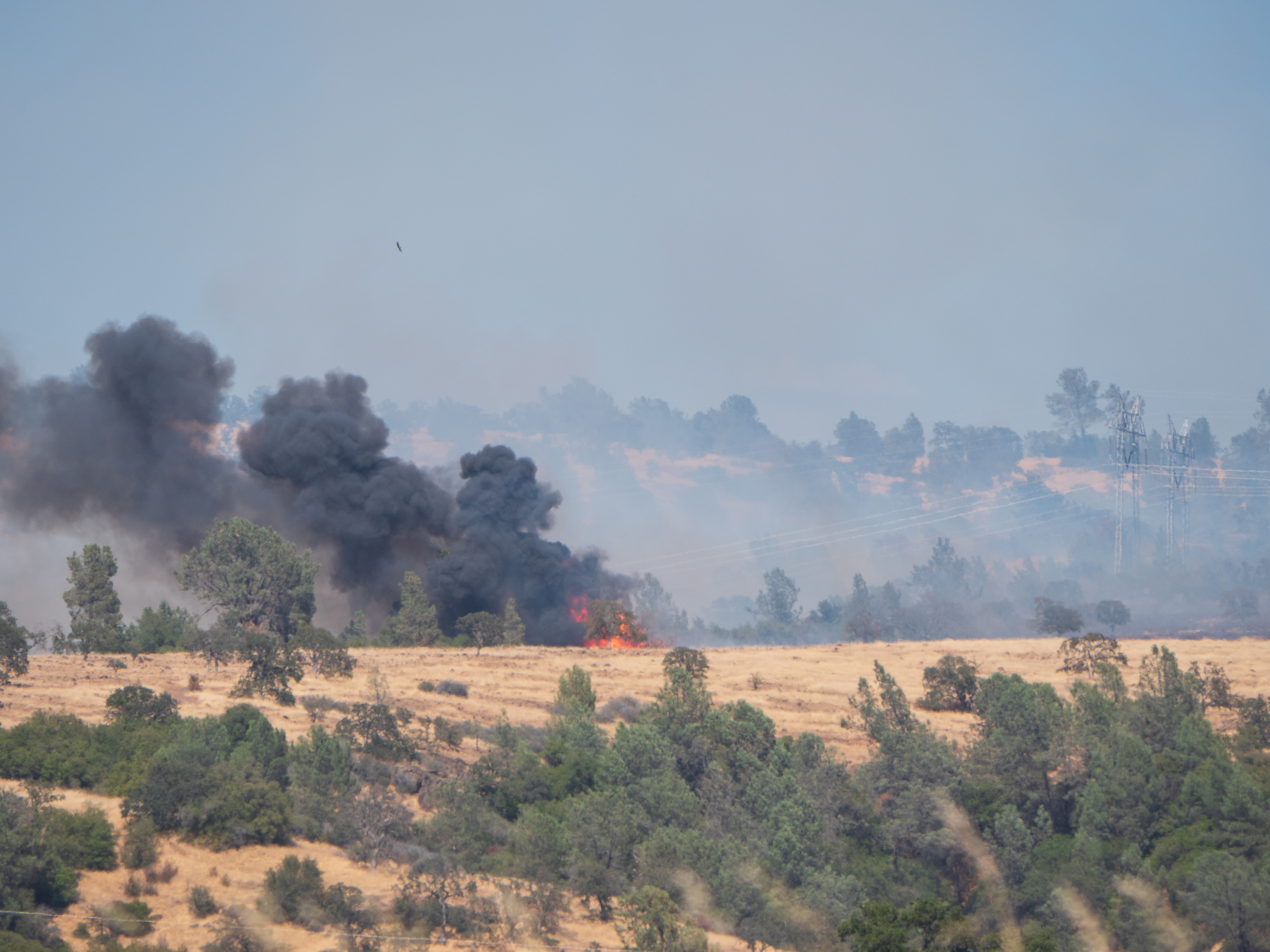
The Park Fire, the largest wildfire of the year in the United States.

- July 7 – Over seventy juveniles are detained in a disturbance at the SouthBay Pavilion mall in Carson.
- July 8 – A Boeing 757 departing from Los Angeles International Airport loses a wheel during takeoff.
- July 16:
  - Gavin Newsom signs a bill preventing school districts from notifying parents of pronoun or name changes.
  - In response to the gender notification policy bill, businessman Elon Musk announces he will move the headquarters of X Corp. and SpaceX to Texas from California.
- July 19 – CrowdStrike incident: A faulty Windows update from cybersecurity company CrowdStrike causes flight delays at Los Angeles International Airport and San Francisco International Airport.
- July 22:
  - The East Solano Plan, a proposal for a walkable city in Solano County, is delayed for at least two years.
  - A ransomware attack shuts down the Los Angeles County Superior Court.
- July 24 – California wildfires: The Park Fire begins burning, the largest wildfire of the year in the United States.
- July 25:
  - Governor Gavin Newsom orders the removal of homeless encampments following the Supreme Court's ruling in City of Grants Pass v. Johnson.
  - The California Supreme Court rules that Uber and Lyft drivers are independent contractors, not employees.
  - A suspect believed to have started the Park Fire by pushing a burning car is arrested.
- July 26:
  - Video game voice actor strike: Video game voice actors represented by SAG-AFTRA begin an indefinite strike following a contract dispute over the use of artificial intelligence.
  - The Regency Village Theatre and the Fox Bruin Theater close indefinitely.
- July 27 – A truck carrying lithium-ion batteries overturns and catches fire on Interstate 15 near Baker.
- July 31:
  - Governor Gavin Newsom signs an extradition warrant seeking the transfer of Harvey Weinstein from New York.
  - University of California president Michael V. Drake announces he will resign.

=== August ===
- August 2:
  - Chevron announces it will move its headquarters from San Ramon to Houston.
  - United States v. TikTok: The United States Department of Justice sues TikTok in the District Court for the Southern District of California for allegedly collecting data on children.
- August 11 – Satinder Pal Singh Raju, a Sikh separatist, is attacked in Yolo County.
- August 14 – A federal judge rules that the University of California, Los Angeles cannot allow pro-Palestinian protesters to prevent Jewish students from entering campus.
- August 15 – Four people are charged in the death of Matthew Perry, including his assistant and two doctors.
- August 21 – Google reaches a US$250 million deal to avoid legislation requiring that the company pays news outlets for distributing their content.
- August 28:
  - Yelp v. Google: Yelp sues Google in the United States District Court for the Northern District of California.
  - The California Legislature approves legislation that would restrict artificial intelligence.
- August 31 – San Francisco 49ers rookie wide receiver Ricky Pearsall is shot and wounded in a robbery over his Rolex watch, in Union Square, San Francisco.

=== September ===
- September 5:
  - Tax evasion prosecution of Hunter Biden: Hunter Biden, the son of U.S. president Joe Biden, accepts an Alford plea to avert a trial.
  - California wildfires: The Line Fire begins burning.
  - A Salinas man is arrested after slaughtering eighty animals that triggered a shelter-in-place order in Monterey County.
- September 6 – The United States Court of Appeals for the Ninth Circuit rules that California and Hawaii can ban guns in parks and bars, but not hospitals.
- September 13 – Boeing machinists strike: Machinists at Boeing go on strike in Southern California.
- September 18 – A 100-foot luxury yacht named The Admiral caught fire while docked in Marina del Rey's Basin A.
- September 20 – California wildfires: Firefighter Robert Hernandez of Cal Fire is arrested for allegedly starting 5 wildfires while off duty between August 15 and September 14.
- September 23 – California sues ExxonMobil, alleging that the company lied about the recyclability of plastic.
- September 24 – A man hijacks a passenger bus in Los Angeles, killing one person.
- September 25 – A bomb explodes in a courthouse in Santa Maria, leaving several people injured. The Preparation was arrested shortly after the bombing happened.

=== October ===
- October 2 – Operation Hate One Eight: A large-scale law enforcement initiative targeted the SFV Peckerwoods, a white supremacist gang based in California's San Fernando Valley. A combined force of federal and local agencies, including the FBI, DEA, and LAPD, led to charges against 68 members and associates. The gang was involved in a range of illegal activities, such as drug trafficking (notably fentanyl), illegal firearm distribution, and defrauding COVID-19 relief programs.
- October 9 – Five people are killed when a Beechcraft Baron aircraft crashes shortly after takeoff from Catalina Airport in Avalon.
- October 12 – Security incidents involving Donald Trump: An armed men is arrested for carrying loaded firearms and fake passports at a security checkpoint near Donald Trump's rally in Coachella.
- October 14 – 2024 Santa Monica College shooting: A shooting occurred at Santa Monica College, leaving one victim, Felicia Hudson, dead. The shooter, identified as Davon Durell Dean, was a college employee. Hudson, a long-time custodial operations manager at the college, was shot during a dispute with Dean, who had been recently placed on administrative leave. After the shooting, Dean fled, leading to a police chase that ended in his death following an exchange of gunfire.
- October 22
  - 2024 UQ: A recently discovered asteroid struck the Earth's atmosphere and burned up harmlessly above the Pacific Ocean off the coast of California.
  - Orange County Supervisor Andrew Do resigns amid serious allegations of corruption and bribery.
- October 30 – 2024 World Series: The Los Angeles Dodgers defeat the New York Yankees in five games, securing their championship with a 4-1 series win.
- October 31 – Former Orange County Supervisor Andrew Do pleaded guilty to bribery charges.

=== November ===
- November 1 – Health officials in Los Angeles County detected the H5N1 avian flu virus in wastewater samples collected at the A.K. Warren Water Resource Facility in Carson.
- November 5:
  - United States presidential election in California: The United States presidential election occurred in California.
  - United States Senate and House of Representatives elections in California: An election to elect a senator and fifty-two representatives in the United States Congress occurred.
  - California Senate and Assembly elections: An election to elect twenty senators and eighty representatives in the state legislature occurred.
- November 8 – Former Los Angeles County Sheriff Jim McDonnell is sworn in as the new chief of the Los Angeles Police Department, succeeding Michel Moore.
- November 13 – A bomb threat prompted the evacuation of a Courthouse in Torrance. Around 7 a.m., a suspicious device was discovered near the building's entrance. The Los Angeles County Sheriff's Department, alongside a bomb squad, responded. A robot detonated the device, which appeared to be an orange inflatable object.
- November 14 – Alaska Airlines Flight 309, a Boeing 737-900 traveling from Washington Dulles to Los Angeles, experienced a serious issue shortly after takeoff. The flight crew declared an emergency due to a tire blowing out. Despite the challenges, the aircraft continued its journey to Los Angeles, where it safely landed at LAX. There were no reported injuries among the 181 passengers and crew.
- November 15 – Samuel Woodward is sentenced to life in prison without the possibility of parole for the hate crime murder of Blaze Bernstein. Bernstein, a 19-year-old gay, Jewish student from the University of Pennsylvania, was killed in January 2018.
- November 16 – Mpox epidemic: The first case of clade I mpox in the United States is reported in California.
- November 18 – The Sol Spin ride at Knott's Berry Farm malfunctioned, leaving 22 riders stranded in midair for over two hours.
- November 19
  - The Los Angeles City Council unanimously passed an ordinance officially designating Los Angeles as a Sanctuary city in response to Donald Trump's victory in the 2024 United States Presidential election.
  - El Mencho's son-in-law, Cristian Fernando Gutierrez-Ochoa, a high ranking CJNG leader, is arrested in Riverside after faking his own death while living in the United States under a phony identity.
- November 22 – An infant dies and at least ten other people fall ill in a listeria outbreak related to ready-to-eat meat and poultry products in California.
- November 25 – Los Angeles Rams wide receiver Demarcus Robinson was arrested on suspicion of driving under the influence after California Highway Patrol officers stopped him after observing him driving at speeds exceeding 100 mph in Los Angeles.
- November 26 – More than 3,000 counterfeit Gibson electric guitars are seized by U.S. Customs and Border Protection officials at the Los Angeles-Long Beach Seaport.

=== December ===
- December 5 – An offshore 7.0 magnitude earthquake strikes near the northern coast of California prompting tsunami warnings.
- December 7 – MLS Cup 2024: The LA Galaxy defeat the New York Red Bulls 2–1 to win their sixth MLS Cup.
- December 18 – Governor Gavin Newsom declared a state of emergency in response to the escalating Avian influenza outbreak affecting both livestock and humans.
- December 23 – A severe storm struck California's central coast, causing a significant portion of the Santa Cruz Wharf to collapse into the Pacific Ocean.
