= 2022 in California =

- Decades: 2000s; 2010s; 2020s
- See also: History of California; Historical outline of California; List of years in California; 2022 in the United States

The year 2022 in California involved several major events.

== Incumbents ==
- Governor: Gavin Newsom (D)
- Lieutenant Governor: Eleni Kounalakis (D)
- Chief Justice: Tani Cantil-Sakauye
- Senate president pro tempore: Toni Atkins (D)
- Speaker of the Assembly: Anthony Rendon (D)

== Politics ==
California State Legislature, 2021–2022 session

- January 3: United States v. Elizabeth A. Holmes, et al.
- September 29: The Zacky Bill
- November 8: 2022 California elections
- November 14-December 23: 2022 University of California academic workers' strike

== Crime ==
- January 13: Murder of Brianna Kupfer
- April 3: 2022 Sacramento shooting
- May 15: 2022 Laguna Woods shooting
- July 11: 2022 Brink's theft
- July 16: Killing of Rob Marquise Adams
- September 27: Stockton serial shootings
- September 28: 2022 Oakland school shooting
- October 28: Attack on Paul Pelosi

== Geography ==
- 2022 California wildfires
- December 2021-January 2022: 2022 Hunga Tonga–Hunga Haʻapai eruption and tsunami
- July–August 2022 United States floods
- December 20: 2022 Ferndale earthquake
- December 26-: 2022–2023 California floods

== Events ==
- January 9: San Francisco Bay Area Film Critics Circle Awards 2022
- April 2: 26th Satellite Awards
- October 25: 50th Anniversary Saturn Awards
- December 4: 12th Streamy Awards
