= 2026 in California =

- Decades: 2000s; 2010s; 2020s
- See also: History of California; Historical outline of California; List of years in California; 2026 in the United States

The year 2026 in California involved the following events.

== Incumbents ==
- Governor: Gavin Newsom (D)
- Lieutenant Governor: Eleni Kounalakis (D)
- Chief Justice: Patricia Guerrero (D)
- Senate president pro tempore: Monique Limón (D)
- Speaker of the Assembly: Robert A. Rivas (D)

== Events ==
=== January ===
- January 1 – 2026 Rose Bowl: The Indiana Hoosiers defeat the Alabama Crimson Tide 38–3, advancing to the semifinals of the College Football Playoff.
- January 2 – A federal appeals court rules that California's ban on open-carry in most parts of the state is unconstitutional.
- January 6
  - Representative Doug LaMalfa (CA-01) dies at age 65.
  - The Department of Health and Human Services announces it is halting $10 billion in social service programs to California and four other Democratic states.
  - For the first time since December 2000, no regions of California are listed as being in active drought by the United States Drought Monitor.
- January 9 – The 9th Astra Film Awards are held at the Sofitel Beverly Hills Hotel in Los Angeles, honoring movies released in 2025. Ryan Coogler's film Sinners wins six awards, including Best Picture – Drama.
- January 11
  - The 83rd Golden Globe Awards are held at The Beverly Hilton in Beverly Hills.
  - A U-Haul truck is driven into a crowd of protesters gathered to support Iranian anti-government protesters in Westwood, Los Angeles. Two people are injured.
- January 13 – The city council of San Jose votes to ban Immigration and Customs Enforcement from using city property for federal operations.
- January 15 – Antoine Watson is convicted of involuntary manslaughter and assault in the killing of Vicha Ratanapakdee, who Watson shoved to the ground in San Francisco in 2021. He is acquitted of murder.
- January 23 – Governor Newsom announces the state of California will join the World Health Organization's Global Outbreak Alert and Response Network. The announcement is made one day after President Donald Trump withdrew the United States from the WHO.
- January 29 – Journalist and former CNN anchor Don Lemon is arrested in Los Angeles in connection to a protest he had reported on at a Saint Paul, Minnesota church on January 18.

=== February ===
- February 1 – The 68th Annual Grammy Awards are held at the Crypto.com Arena in Los Angeles. "Luther" by Kendrick Lamar and SZA wins Record of the Year, while Debí Tirar Más Fotos by Bad Bunny wins Album of the Year, the first Spanish language album to do so.
- February 5 – Three people are killed and six injured after a car crashes into a 99 Ranch Market in Westwood, Los Angeles.
- February 7 – A man is arrested and charged with intentionally driving his car through the front of a Safeway in Truckee, injuring four.
- February 8 – Super Bowl LX is played at Levi's Stadium in Santa Clara, in which the Seattle Seahawks beat the New England Patriots. Bad Bunny is the halftime performer.
- February 9
  - At least 6,000 schoolteachers from the San Francisco Unified School District (SFUSD) go on strike. SFUSD closes all 120 of its schools and offers its 50,000 students independent study in response.
  - A federal judge blocks a state law that would have banned federal law enforcement agents from wearing masks that obscure their faces, saying the law discriminates against the federal government because it did not apply to state officers. The judge leaves in place a part of the law requiring federal agents to have clear identification showing their agency and badge number.
- February 17 – An avalanche kills eight skiers in the Castle Peak area northwest of Lake Tahoe.
- February 24 – The Justice Department sues the University of California, Los Angeles, accusing it of not doing enough to prevent antisemetism.
- February 25 – The Federal Bureau of Investigation raids the headquarters of the Los Angeles Unified School District and the home of its superintendent Alberto M. Carvalho.
- February 26 – The Los Angeles Metro launches the Ride the D t-shirts to commemorate the opening of Section 1 of the D Line subway extension. It is sold out by the following day.

=== March ===
- March 1 – The 32nd Actor Awards (previously the Screen Actors Guild Awards) are held at the Shrine Auditorium and Expo Hall in Los Angeles.
- March 5 – Two men are arrested for assaulting San Francisco Mayor Daniel Lurie's bodyguards in the Tenderloin neighborhood.
- March 7 – In Downtown Oakland, two people are killed and five injured in a shooting at a bar at 3:30 a.m. The following afternoon, at least one person is detained in connection with the shooting.
- March 8
  - Nathan Martin wins the 2026 Los Angeles Marathon in the marathon's closest-ever finish, becoming the second consecutive American to win the event.
  - A Florida woman is arrested in Beverly Hills for firing an AR-15 rifle at singer Rihanna's residence. Rihanna, her husband A$AP Rocky, their children, and Rihanna's mother are in the home, but are uninjured. The suspect is charged with attempted murder.
- March 9 – Republican Representative Kevin Kiley announces he is dropping his affiliation to the Republican Party and will register as an independent.
- March 15 – The 98th Academy Awards is held at the Dolby Theatre in Los Angeles. One Battle After Another wins six awards, including Best Picture.
- March 18 – The California Museum announces it will remove Cesar Chavez from the California Hall of Fame, following a report by The New York Times of accusations that Chavez sexually abused women and girls.
- March 20 – Riverside County Sheriff Chad Bianco seizes over half a million ballots from a November referendum on redistricting. Bianco, a candidate for governor, says he is investigating a ballot count discrepancy.
- March 22 – The show "Bluey's Best Day Ever!", based on the Australian television series Bluey, premieres at Fantasyland Theatre at Disneyland.
- March 25 – In a landmark case, a Los Angeles County Superior Court jury finds Meta and YouTube liable for intentionally addicting young users and damaging their mental health. The lawsuit was also filed against Snap and TikTok, who both settled before trial.
- March 26
  - The California House of Representatives votes to rename Cesar Chavez Day to Farmworkers Day.
  - The 2026 iHeartRadio Music Awards are held at the Dolby Theatre in Los Angeles.
- March 28 - No Kings protests are held in several cities in California. In Los Angeles, police arrest 74 protesters for failure to disperse.

=== April ===
- April 2 – A 4.6 magnitude earthquake strikes northern California, with the epicenter being a mile away from Boulder Creek.
- April 5 – The UCLA Bruins beat the South Carolina Gamecocks 79–51 to win the 2026 NCAA Division I women's basketball championship game, their first title.
- April 7
  - A six-alarm fire is set at a Kimberly-Clark warehouse in Ontario, causing the roof to collapse. A suspect is detained on arson; videos posted by the suspect on Facebook show him setting items on fire while complaining about being paid low wages.
  - ICE agents shoot a man in Patterson.
- April 10
  - A man is arrested for allegedly setting several fires at Nordstrom Rack and True Religion stores in the Ontario Mills shopping center. Police say the arson is unrelated to the warehouse fire from three days prior.
  - A man is arrested for allegedly throwing a Molotov cocktail at the San Francisco home of OpenAI CEO Sam Altman.
  - Democrats ask congressman Eric Swalwell to drop out of the governor's race after four women accuse him of sexual assault and harassment.
- April 10–19 – Coachella 2026 in Indio.
- April 12
  - Eric Swalwell suspends his gubernatorial campaign following sexual assault allegations.
  - Two people are arrested for allegedly shooting at Sam Altman's home. The shooting is not believed to be related to the Molotov attack a few days prior.
- April 13 – Eric Swalwell announces he will resign from congress.
- April 15 – Demolition of Westminster Mall begins to make way for the Bolsa Pacific redevelopment.
- April 16 – Musician D4vd, legal name David Burke, is arrested in connection to the murder of Celeste Rivas Hernandez, a 14-year-old girl whose remains were found in a Tesla car owned by Burke in 2025.
- April 20 – The pre-service testing of SkyLink begins at the Los Angeles International Airport.
- April 28 – The cities of San Francisco and Oakland settle a lawsuit filed by the former over Oakland naming their airport the San Francisco Bay Oakland International Airport. As part of the settlement, Oakland is allowed to call the airport the Oakland San Francisco Bay Airport, but the words "San Francisco Bay" must be used instead of just "San Francisco", the words "San Francisco Bay" cannot be highlighted in any way, and the airport cannot have the word "international" in its name, despite offering international flights.
- April 30 – Police arrest several protesters during a May Day demonstration at San Francisco International Airport. The arrested include Board of Supervisors President Rafael Mandelman, Supervisor Connie Chan, State Senator Josh Becker, and former Supervisor Jane Kim.

=== May ===
- May 3 – The Los Angeles Times reports that the last California-bound oil tanker to pass through the Strait of Hormuz before the 2026 crisis is offloading at the Port of Long Beach.
- May 4 – The OCTA announces that the OC Streetcar will not be in service as usual by August 2026, pushing the approximate date to March 2027.
- May 6 – Google asks the Environmental Protection Agency to approve a plan to release mosquitos carrying Wolbachia into California to reduce the population of mosquitos that carry dengue, Zika and chikungunya as a form of biological pest control.
- May 8
  - The Los Angeles Metro D Line is extended 3.9 miles (6.3 km) west from Koreatown to Beverly Hills with three new stations, marking the first time a Los Angeles Metro subway system being extended since 2000.
  - General Motors agrees to pay $12.75 million for selling data of motorists to data brokers without their consent. It is the largest ever payment for violation of the California Consumer Privacy Act.
- May 11 – Arcadia Mayor Eileen Wang pleads guilty to acting as a foreign agent for the People's Republic of China and resigns.
- May 13 – The Trump Administration withholds $1.3 billion in Medicaid funding to California over fraud allegations.
- May 15
  - An Orange County judge bans Kars4Kids ads in the state of California, ruling that the charity's ads were misleading donators about what their donations were funding.
  - The Santa Rosa Island Fire begins.
- May 16 – A driver crashes into multiple pedestrians in Oakland, killing three people.
- May 18
  - Three people are killed in a shooting at the Islamic Center of San Diego, the largest mosque in San Diego. The two shooters, aged 17 and 18, die by suicide in a vehicle nearby.
  - A fast moving wildfire in the Simi Valley area destroys a home and results in an evacuation order for over 29,000 residents.
  - The DOJ criminally charge a Los Angeles woman for paying people to register to vote, including homeless people on Skid Row. She faces up to five years in federal prison for the offense and has entered a guilty plea.
- May 19 – The Professional Women's Hockey League (PWHL) announces an expansion team in San Jose.
- May 21 – The possibility of an explosion of a leaking chemical tank of methyl methacrylate in Garden Grove triggers a mass evacuation.
- May 27
  - Newsom signs SB73 into law, limiting law enforcement access to state ballots, voter lists, rosters or certified voting technology. The law takes effect immediately.
  - Newsom vows to impose a 100% tax on state recipients of Trump's $1.8 billion "anti-weaponization" fund.

=== June ===
- June 1 – Over 1,000 people dressed as Marilyn Monroe gather in Palm Springs, breaking a Guinness World Record, in celebration of what would have been Monroe's 100th birthday.
- June 2 – Primaries are held.
  - Los Angeles mayoral election: Incumbent mayor Karen Bass and City Councilwoman Nithya Raman advance to the run-off.
  - California gubernatorial election: Democrat Xavier Becerra and Republican Steve Hilton advance to the run-off.
- June 2–3 – A man takes ten people hostage at the Kern County Superintendents of Schools office in Bakersfield. Following a 15-hour stand-off, FBI agents fatally shoot the man.
- June 6 – The Looney Tunes Land opens at Six Flags Magic Mountain.
- June 11 – A medical equipment warehouse in Tracy is destroyed in a fire.
- June 11–July 19 – The United States co-hosts the 2026 FIFA World Cup alongside Canada and Mexico, with a number of games being played at SoFi Stadium in Inglewood and Levi's Stadium in Santa Clara.
- June 12 – San Francisco Giants players Landen Roupp, JT Brubaker and Ryan Walker write Bible verses on their hats, which have rainbow logos, during the Giants's Pride Night game against the Chicago Cubs. MLB warns the players over this, though it states that the warning is due to writing on the caps and not the messages themselves.
- June 13 – While responding to a noise complaint in Canoga Park, LAPD officers shoot a dog, a St. Bernard-golden retriever-poodle mix. The noise complaint was sparked by the dog's owner shouting in response to the New York Knicks winning the NBA playoffs, and the dog was wearing a Knicks jersey when officers shot it.
- June 14 – The Los Angeles Pride Parade takes place in Hollywood.
- June 15 – A B-52 bomber crashes shortly after takeoff from Edwards Air Force Base, killing eight people.
- June 17 – A fire breaks out at a cold food storage facility in Boyle Heights, Los Angeles. Governor Newsom declares a state of emergency three days later.
- June 22 – A man fatally shoots two people at the Butte County Public Library in Chico. The 18-year-old suspect is arrested at the scene.
- June 26 – The Humboldt County Sheriff's Office says investigators have found the remains of 117 dogs, many with gunshot wounds, at a no-kill shelter in Fortuna.
- June 28 – One person is killed and another injured in a shooting at a San Jose entertainment spot.
- June 30 – Governor Newsom signs a bill designating May 17 as Bruce Lee Day.

=== July ===
- July 3 – Paul Pelosi, husband of former House Speaker Nancy Pelosi, is involved in a vehicle collision in Yountville. The sheriff's office says Pelosi hit a parked car, briefly stopped, then drove away.
- July 8 – The Women's Pro Baseball League reveals the names of two of its inaugural teams in California, the San Francisco Firebells and Los Angeles Queens.
- July 16 – A water main break in West Hollywood causes flooding, damaging buildings and opening a sinkhole.
- July 16–17 – A man takes two United States Forest Service employees hostage at Shasta–Trinity National Forest. Following hours of negotiations, the two employees are released from the man's trailer. The man and his son are arrested.
- July 31 – Governor Gavin Newsom and his wife Jennifer Siebel Newsom release their tax returns.

=== August ===
- August 1 – The annual World Dog Surfing Championships are held in Pacifica.
- August 2 – A man is arrested near Trump National Golf Club in Rancho Palos Verdes after he is observed taking photos of the course, with deputies finding a loaded handgun in his car.
- August 5 – Los Angeles County health officials issue a measles warning case at the Universal Studios Hollywood amusement park in Los Angeles, California, U.S., after a person who visited the park last month tested positive for the disease.
- August 7 – A small plane crashes in downtown Ukiah. One pilot suffers minor injuries, and there is no major damage.
- August 13 – The Disney Jr. Let's Play! Block Party cavalcade is held at Disney California Adventure, where Bluey and Bingo from Bluey first appeared.
- August 14–16 – The D23 fan event is held at the Anaheim Convention Center and the Honda Center. Information about several upcoming films is announced, including The Bluey Movie, Avengers: Doomsday, and Ice Age: Boiling Point.
- August 15 – The Palisades Village shopping center reopens after the Palisades Fire in the Pacific Palisades.
- August 17
  - Security at Vandenberg Space Force Base hold two military members and five journalists at gunpoint as they attempt to enter for an event they were invited to. The journalists include reporters from Noozhawk, KEYT, KSBY, and the Santa Maria Times, and they miss the event as a result.
  - $70,000 worth of Pabst Blue Ribbon is stolen from an Anheuser-Busch distribution center in Montclair in two thefts. In the first, $45,000 worth of beer is picked up but not delivered. In the second, a fake subcontractor submits falsified documents to pick up $25,000 worth of beer.
- August 18
  - The San Diego County Board of Supervisors votes 3–2 to stop letting ICE agents train at county-owned firing ranges.
  - The Kern County district attorney reopens an investigation into an April 2021 sting operation by Alex Rosen and the Predator Poachers organization in Bakersfield. This occurs after the release of a documentary called The Sick Mind Of EDP445, which focuses on former YouTuber EDP445, real name Bryant Moreland, who was accused of meeting a decoy posing as a 13-year-old girl.
  - Four people are killed in an arson at a Richmond home, including two children. A family member of the victims is arrested.
- August 19 – Five people are stabbed and injured at a restaurant in the Thunder Valley Casino Resort in Placer County. The victims and the suspect are identified as restaurant employees.
- August 20 – State Senator Aisha Wahab wins the special election to replace Representative Eric Swalwell, who resigned earlier in the year. She is the first Afghan American in Congress.
- August 31 – The Forsyth County, North Carolina district attorney announces that a 17-year-old girl has been charged with murder by aiding and abetting in connection to the San Diego mosque shooting from May 18. The girl is accused of recording a livestream of the shooting and publishing the shooters' manifesto at their request.

=== September ===
- September 1 – John Ternus becomes Apple's new CEO, while Tim Cook becomes executive chairman.
- September 3 – One pedestrian is killed and 4 injured after a Tesla Model 3 strikes pedestrians in a Trader Joe's parking lot near The Grove in Los Angeles.
- September 9 – The Trump administration accuses UC Berkeley School of Law of discriminating against white and Asian applicants.
- September 14 – Seven people are injured after a four-vehicle collision in San Francisco.
- September 15 – A SUV drives into the side of a metro bus in Chatsworth, Los Angeles, killing two people. A KNBC helicopter crashes while covering the bus crash, killing two KNBC employees and a person on the ground.
- September 20 – Two firefighters are killed in a helicopter crash while battling the Dome Fire in Yosemite National Park.
- September 22 – The Los Angeles Queens win the inaugural WPBL championship.
- September 24 – The California Supreme Court orders Riverside County Sheriff Chad Bianco to return the ballots he seized earlier in the year.
- September 26 – Jonathan McKinsey, engineering director of the games department at The New York Times, is shot and killed at a Dublin park. His estranged wife's parents are arrested at the scene.

=== October ===
- October 1 – An eight-vehicle collision in Oxnard leaves two dead.
- October 8 – After more than 300 days at sea, the USS Abraham Lincoln docks in San Diego.
- October 9 – An off-duty ICE agent is shot by a 72-year-old man and arrested in Fresno. According to police, the agent fell asleep on a woman's lawn and assaulted the woman's father when he confronted him. The father is not charged.
- October 17 – ICE agents tase and beat an American citizen while trying to detain him in Long Beach, breaking his arm.
- October 31 – The Golden State Valkyries beat the Atlanta Dream in game 7 of the 2026 WNBA Finals. The Valkyries are the fastest WNBA expansion team to win a title, having done so in their second season as a team.

=== November ===
- November 3 – Statewide elections are held in California.
  - 2026 California gubernatorial election: Xavier Becerra beats Steve Hilton to become governor of California.
- November 5 – Governor Newsom announces he is commuting the sentences of all 548 people on California's death row.
- November 10 – An SUV jumps a curb and hits pedestrians near a Los Angeles Metro station in North Hollywood, killing three people. The 61-year-old driver is arrested and charged with murder and driving under the influence.
- November 11 – The state of California bans driverless Waymo vehicles from state highways following an incident in which a Waymo tried to drive past a police traffic break near San Francisco.
- November 16 – A chemical plume rises from the Chiquita Canyon Landfill and an evacuation advisory is issued for the nearby neighborhoods of Val Verde. A rare chemical reaction deep within the landfill has plagued the site for 4 years.
- November 19 – Jonathan Rinderknecht is convicted of arson for setting the Palisades Fire on New Years Day in 2025. The fire killed 12 people and destroyed over 6,000 structures.

== Deaths ==
- April 20: Malissa Sherwood, 50, wrestler and mixed martial artist.
- June 10: Gina Ferrall, 67, actress (death announced on this date).
- August 26: Joyce L. Kennard, 85, first Asian-American justice of the Supreme Court of California.
- October 28: Dolores Huerta, 96, labor activist.

== See also ==
- 2026 in the United States
