= Muñoz SAFE Act =

2023 California law

California State Legislature
- Long title: Muñoz Student Allergy Framework for Emergencies Act
- Signed by: Gavin Newsom
- Status: Current legislation

The Muñoz SAFE Act (AB 1651), also known as the Muñoz Student Allergy Framework for Emergencies Act, is a California health and safety law concerning pupils with life-threatening food allergies. The legislation was authored by youth advocate Zacky Muñoz.

== History ==
In 2023, Zacky Muñoz authored the Muñoz SAFE Act. The bill was signed into law in November 2023 by Governor Gavin Newsom. It was introduced by Assembly Member Kate Sanchez and co-authored by Senator Bob Archuleta.

== Details of the Muñoz SAFE Act ==
The Muñoz SAFE Act includes the following requirements:

- Requires schools, educational offices, and charter schools to store epinephrine auto-injectors in accessible locations for emergency use.
- Mandates annual training for school and after-school staff.
- Requires schools to retain a physical copy of instructions about the location of epinephrine auto-injectors.
- Permits schools to designate individuals with Activity Supervisor Clearance Certificates, such as volunteers, to receive training to administer epinephrine via auto-injector during emergencies.

== See also ==
- The Zacky Bill
