= Society of California Pioneers =

Coordinates: 37.79994°N 122.4597°W

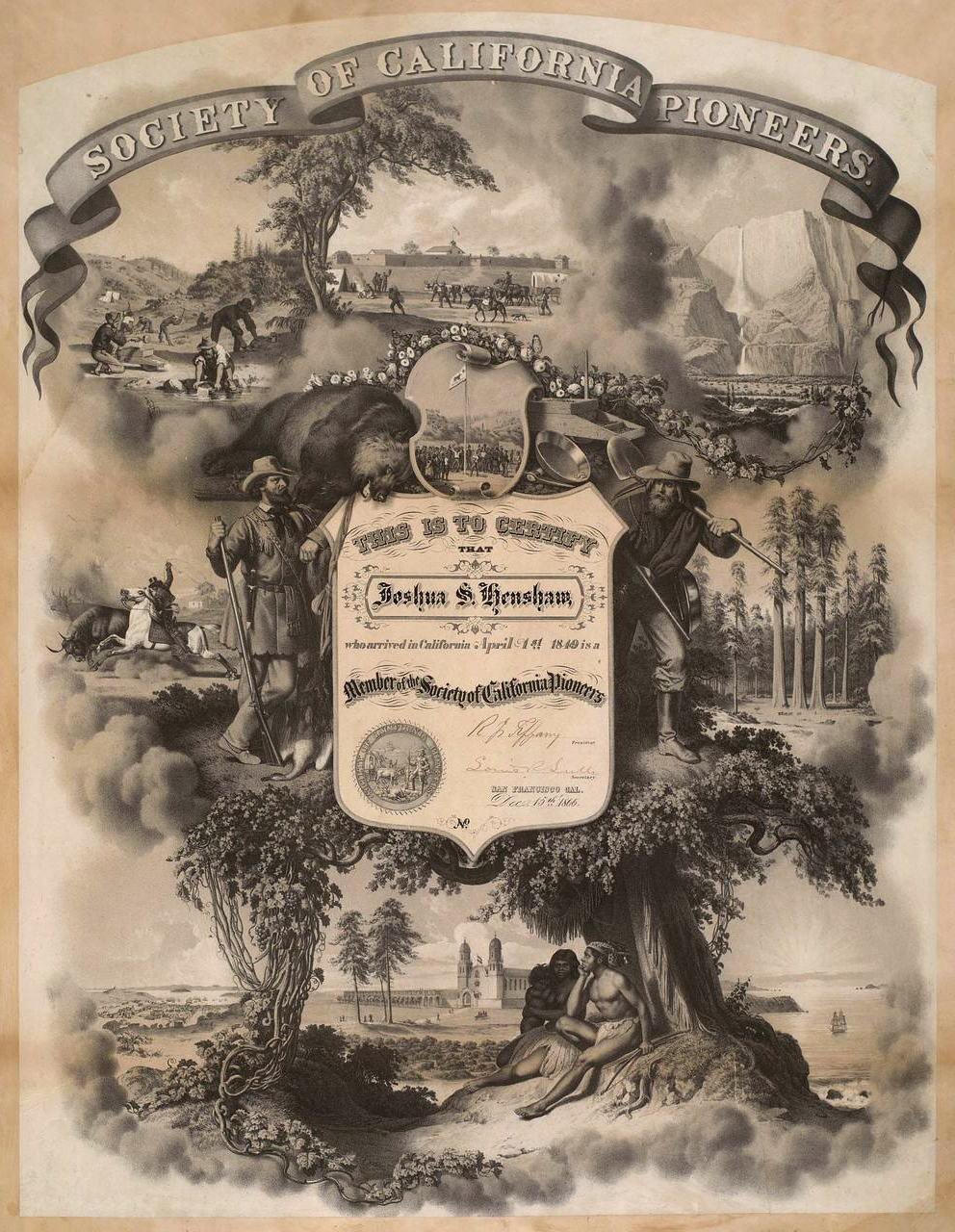
Society of California Pioneers membership certificate – Issued to Joshua S. Henshaw, December 15, 1866

The Society of California Pioneers, established in 1850, is a membership organization dedicated to collect and preserve materials related to the formation of the State of California. Founded by individuals arriving in California before 1850 and perpetuated today by direct descendants, the Society has continuously served its members, the academic community, and the public since 1850.

As of 2026, the Society operates a research library, The Alice Phelan Sullivan Library, in their building at 300 4th Street in San Francisco.

== Mission and membership ==
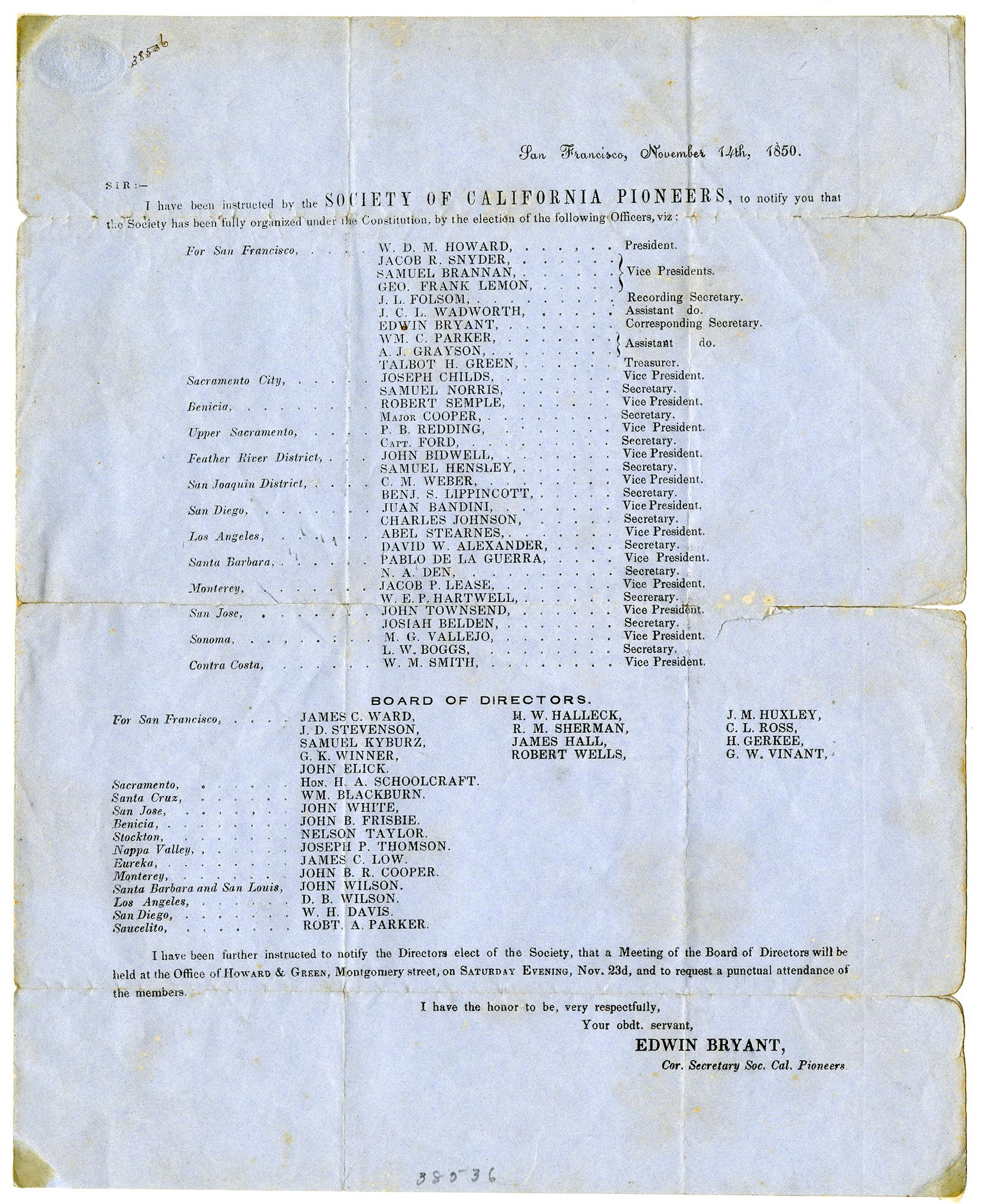
Notice of Officer Election & Organization – November 14th, 1850

According to its constitution, the Society's mission is "to collect and preserve information connected with the early settlement and formation of the state of California. The Society's service to the community is designed to support scholarship and encourage new interpretations that illuminate and honor the diverse experiences of California's past.

The Society continues to be a membership organization "open to direct descendants of those who arrived in California prior to January 1, 1850."

== Physical Locations ==
The Society has operated from a variety of physical locations. Prior to 1863, the Society met in various rented rooms in San Francisco.

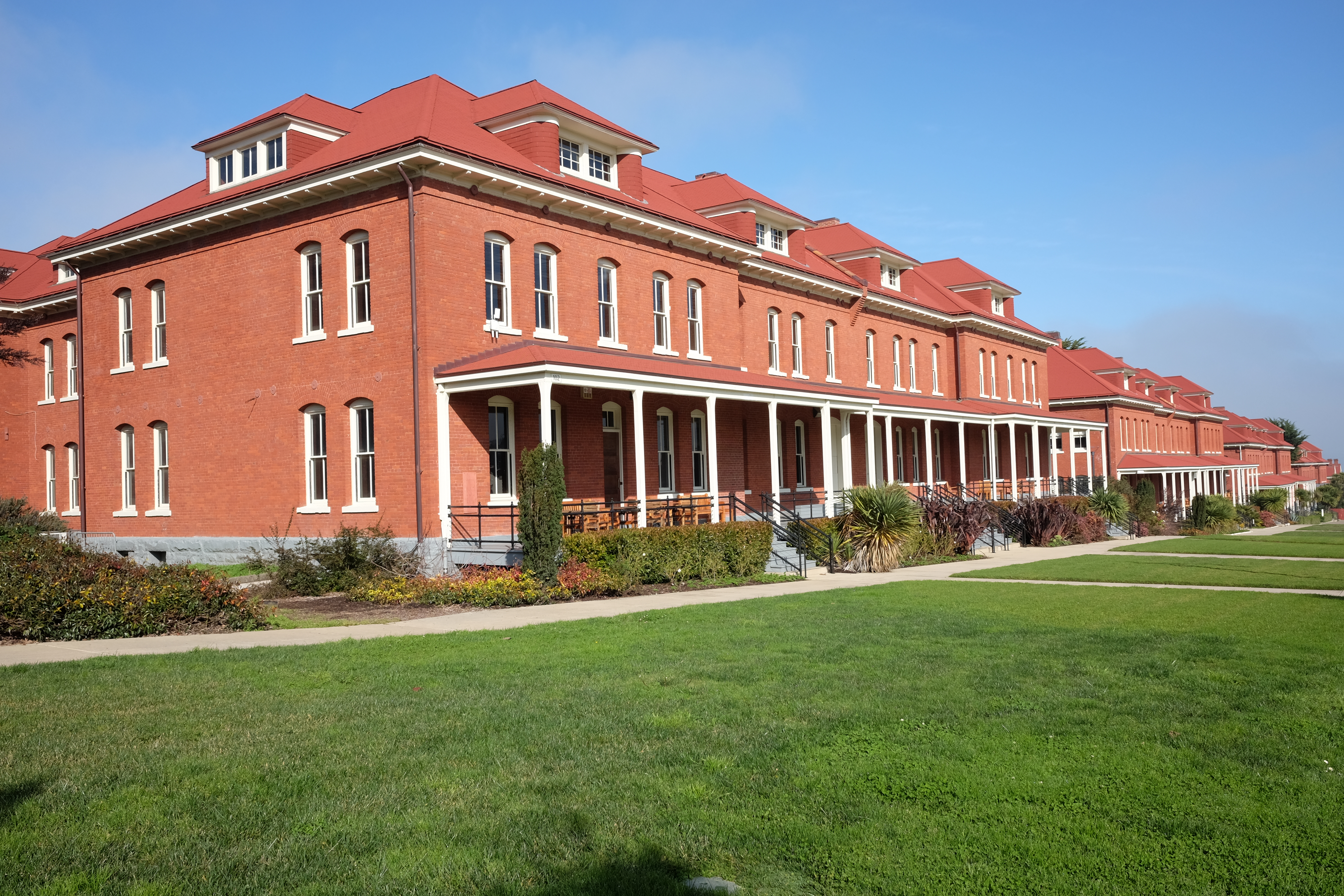
Main Post of the Presidio of San Francisco, as seen in 2018

=== Pioneer Hall ===
The first Pioneer Hall (1863-1886) was located at Montgomery and Gold Streets, on land donated by Society member James Lick. The second Pioneer Hall (1886-1906) was located on Fourth Street and Pioneer Place (between Market and Jessie Streets), also on land donated by James Lick. Both the first and second Pioneer Halls were destroyed in the 1906 San Francisco earthquake and fire. Following the disaster, the third Pioneer Hall was rebuilt on the site of the second Pioneer Hall, where the organization remained until 1936. That year, the Fourth Street property was sold and the Society moved to the fourth Pioneer Hall at 456 McAllister Street in San Francisco’s Civic Center. In 1994, the Society was forced to move out of the McAllister Street location to make way for the construction of the Civic Center Courthouse building. The Society relocated to 300 Fourth Street at Folsom, the fifth Pioneer Hall, in 1996. In 2014, faced with rising costs and seeking improved public visibility, the Society moved to one of the iconic Montgomery Street Barracks buildings on The Presidio of San Francisco's historic Main Post. The Society left the Presidio and returned to 300 Fourth Street in 2024.

=== Alice Phelan Sullivan Library ===
The Society opened the first state's library. As of 2026, the Alice Phelan Sullivan Research Library, which houses a large portion of the Society's collections, also allows limited public access (or research visitations by appointment) to the Society's privately held repository of rare primary source materials.

=== Museum ===
In 2014, the Society opened a museum when they moved to their Presidio location. The museum closed in 2024, due to rent quadrupling.

== Collection ==
Documents from the Society's archives record defining events dating back to the founding and early history of California, including The Gold Rush, The Earthquake and Fire of 1906, and many others. Their collection includes manuscripts and letters, paintings, prints and drawings, photographs, books, maps, newspapers and journals, and the business ledgers of mining and transportation companies, as well as historic artifacts and decorative objects.

An extensive collection of overland and pioneer diaries held here includes those of John A. Sutter and a letter by Henry William Bigler, both primary sources announcing the discovery of gold in California. Works by Carleton Watkins, Eadweard Muybridge, Silas Selleck, Lawrence & Houseworth, and Turrill & Miller are held in the Society's archive of photographs, panoramas, and daguerreotypes. In the words of historian Gary Kurutz, the Lawrence & Houseworth album "is without doubt the finest single pictorial record of the maturation of Northern California and the Pacific Coast following the rambunctious days of the Gold Rush and statehood."

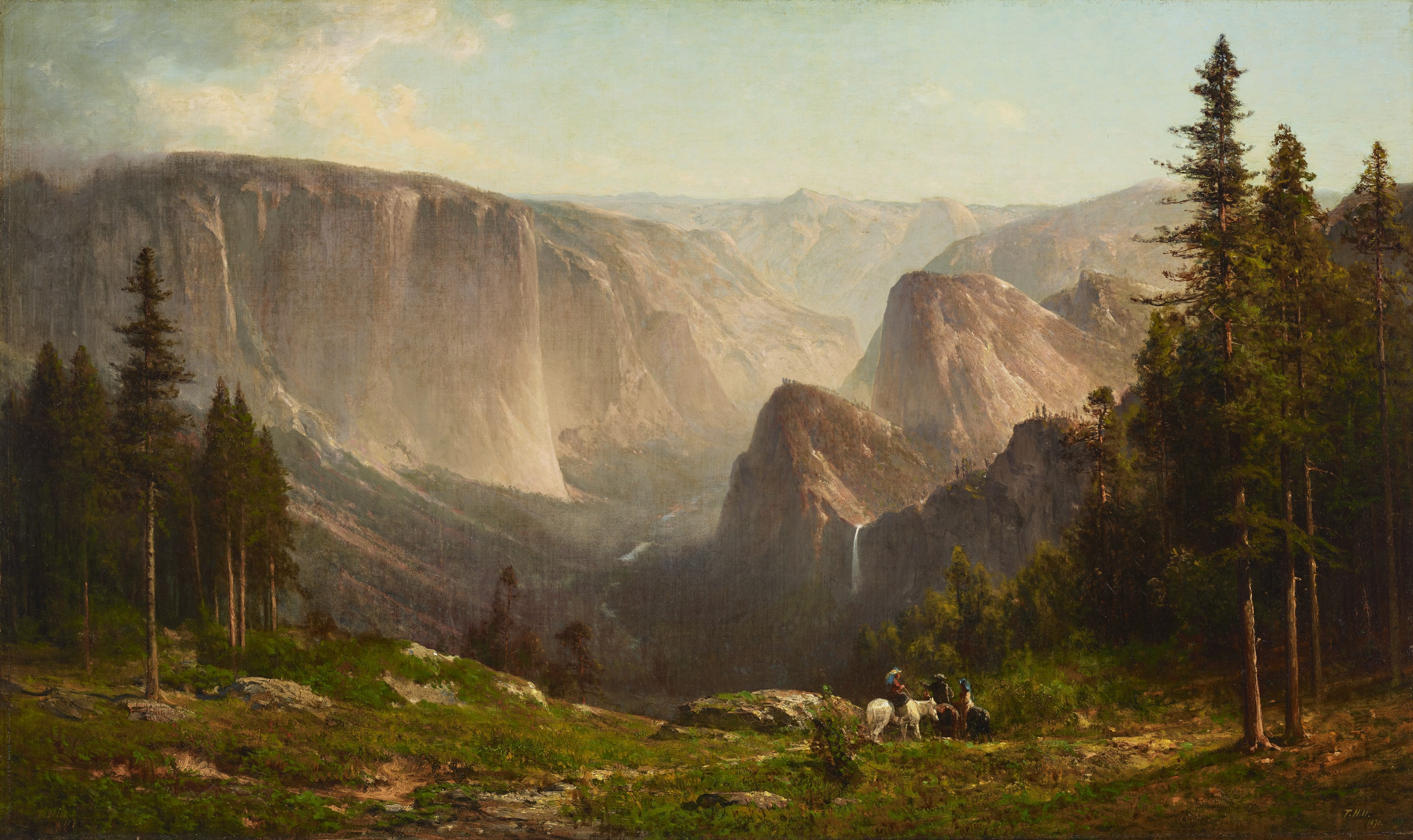
Yosemite landscape by Thomas Hill (1871)

Particularly notable for its nineteenth-century holdings, the museum's painting collection includes works by noted landscape artists Thomas Hill and Jules Tavernier, mural artist William Coulter, and Fresno-born artist/illustrator Maynard Dixon. Together with the Society's collection of ephemera and prints, the collection provides a visual record of life in California and the American West over time.

== See also ==
- List of historical societies in California
- California Pioneers of Santa Clara County
- Indigenous peoples of California
