= 2025 in California =

- Decades: 2000s; 2010s; 2020s
- See also: History of California; Historical outline of California; List of years in California; 2025 in the United States

The year 2025 in California involved the following events.

== Incumbents ==
- Governor: Gavin Newsom (D)
- Lieutenant Governor: Eleni Kounalakis (D)
- Chief Justice: Patricia Guerrero (D)
- Senate president pro tempore:
  - Mike McGuire (D) (until November 17)
  - Monique Limón (D) (starting November 17)
- Speaker of the Assembly: Robert A. Rivas (D)

== Events ==
=== January ===
- January 1 – 2025 Rose Bowl: The Ohio State Buckeyes defeat the Oregon Ducks 41–21, advancing to the semifinals of the College Football Playoff.
- January 7

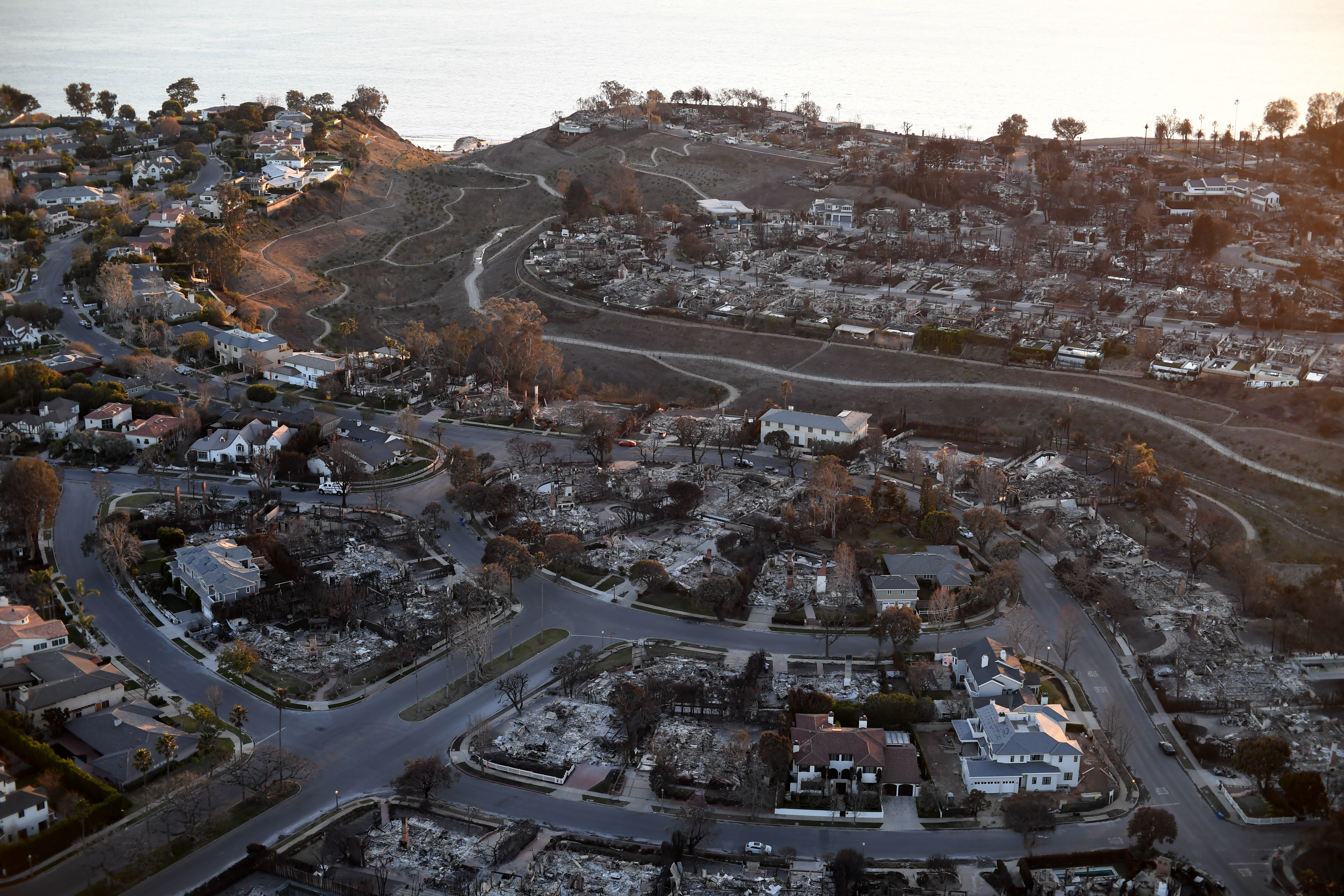
January 15: Aftermath of the Palisades Fire in Los Angeles.

  - Palisades Fire: A wildlife erupts in Pacific Palisades, Los Angeles. In October, a man is arrested and charged with starting the fire.
  - Eaton Fire: A wildfire starts in Altadena. The fire kills 19 people and destroys over 9,000 structures.
- January 8 – January 2025 Southern California wildfires: The Wildfires spreads to more areas of Los Angeles County.
- January 10 – Operation Return to Sender: Over 60 U.S. Border Patrol agents in Kern County arrested 78 undocumented Migrants during a 3 day operation in Bakersfield.
- January 21
  - Operation Los Impuestos: 39 Members of the Mexican Mafia are arrested in San Diego during a coordinated takeover by the San Diego Police Department's Street Gang Unit, the Drug Enforcement Administration, and the Bureau of Alcohol, Tobacco, Firearms and Explosives.
  - The city of Huntington Beach declares itself a non-sanctuary city.
- January 27 – Federal authorities arrest 8 individuals involved in a large-scale smuggling operation that illicitly imported counterfeit and illegal goods from China into the United States through the Ports of Los Angeles and Long Beach.
- January 28 – In San Diego, 16-year-old Konoa Wilson is at a train station when another teenager shoots at him. As Wilson flees and exits the station, a nearby San Diego Police officer shoots him in the back, killing him. While Wilson had a firearm on his person, he did not brandish it towards the officer, who did not identify himself until after the shooting. The city reaches a $30 million settlement in December.
- January 30 – A two-venue benefit concert called FireAid is held at the Kia Forum and Intuit Dome; proceeds are intended to help people impacted by the wildfires earlier in the month.

=== February ===
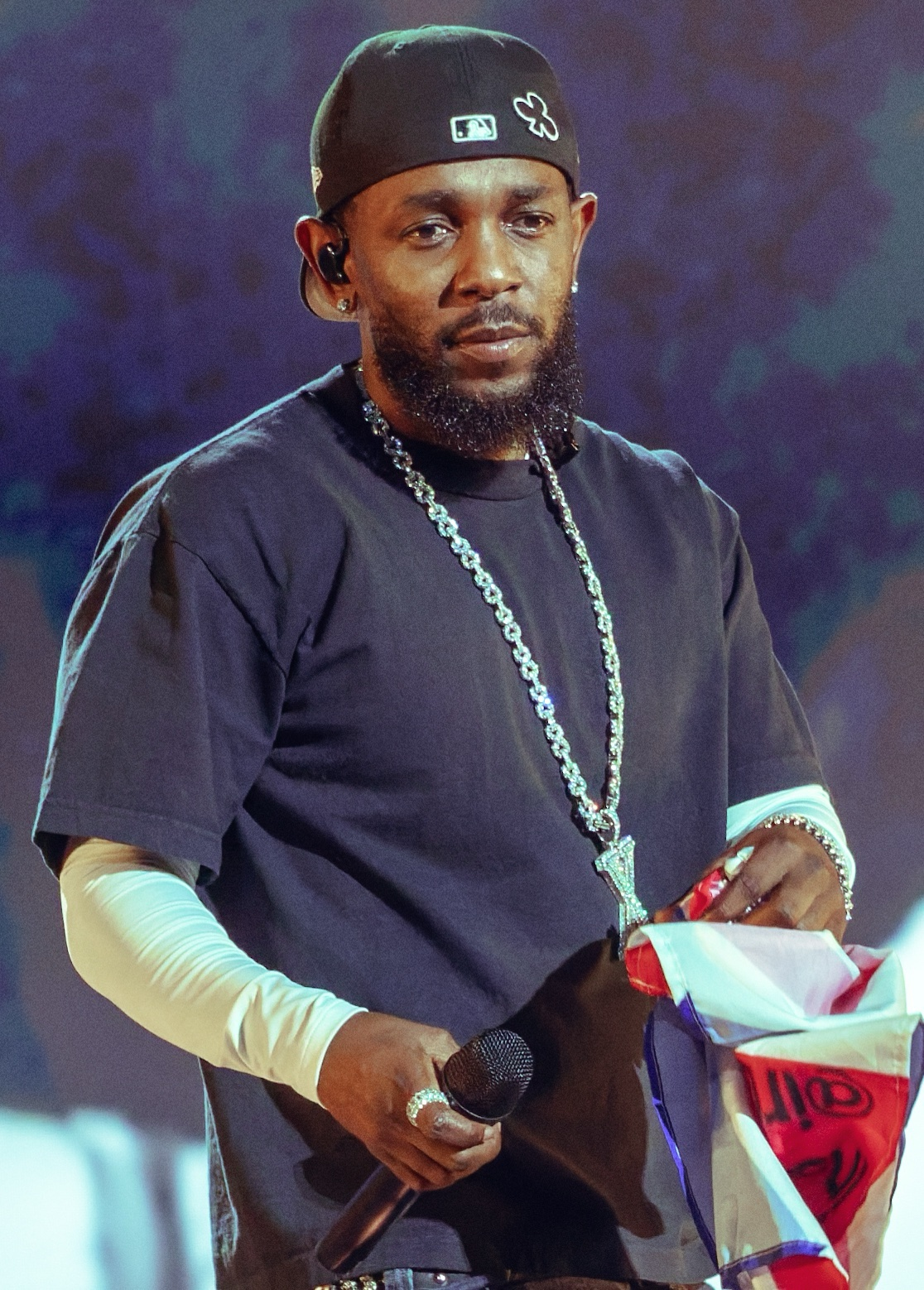
February 2: Kendrick Lamar's (pictured) song and diss track against Drake wins five awards at the Grammy Awards.

- February 2
  - The 67th Annual Grammy Awards is held at the Crypto.com Arena in Los Angeles, honoring the best in music from September 2023 to August 2024.
  - February 2025 Los Angeles protests: Thousands of protesters convened at Olvera Street in downtown Los Angeles to voice their dissent against the heightened activities of U.S. Immigration and Customs Enforcement.
- February 18 – Former NFL punter Chris Kluwe is arrested for civil disobedience during a Huntington Beach City Council meeting.
- February 21 – LAFD chief Kristin Crowley is fired by Mayor Karen Bass.

=== March ===
- March 2 – The 97th Academy Awards is held at the Dolby Theatre in Hollywood, Los Angeles, honoring the best in films released in 2024.
- March 11 – American Musician Wes Scantlin is arrested for domestic violence against his girlfriend and drug possession in Torrance.
- March 17 – The 2025 iHeartRadio Music Awards is held in the Dolby Theatre, Los Angeles, California.
- March 28 – Comedian and actor Paul Rodriguez is arrested for drug possession during a traffic stop in Burbank.
- March 31 – A man shoots at employees of a Walgreens in Madera, killing one. The Madera Police chief says the suspect told police he was motivated by a dislike of big pharmacies.

=== April ===
- April 4 – A fire occurs in the Pixar Pals parking structure at Disneyland Resort in Anaheim, resulting in damage to multiple vehicles.
- April 14 – The Stockton Kings win the 2024–25 NBA G League finals, beating the Osceola Magic 118–110 in game three.
- April 15 – Barbara Lee is elected Mayor of Oakland, defeating Loren Taylor.

=== May ===
- May 4 – President Donald Trump announces his intent to reopen Alcatraz Federal Penitentiary, which closed in 1963.
- May 17 – A car bomb is detonated outside a fertility clinic in Palm Springs. The bomber is killed and four people are injured.
- May 20 – An off-duty Yosemite National Park ranger hangs a 66-foot wide transgender flag at El Capitan for about two hours. They are later fired.
- May 22 – 2025 San Diego Cessna Citation II crash: A plane crashes in a San Diego neighborhood. Six people, including music agent Dave Shapiro, are killed, and eight people in the neighborhood are hospitalized for non-life-threatening injuries.

=== June ===
- June 6:
  - Federal immigration authorities conduct a series of coordinated raids across Los Angeles, resulting in the arrest of at least 500 individuals. The operations target multiple locations, including a clothing warehouse, Home Depot parking lots, and a doughnut shop. Demonstrations erupt in response, leading to confrontations between protesters and law enforcement.
  - The LAX/Metro Transit Center opens for passengers, with a new light rail station serving the Los Angeles Metro C & K lines. The LAX Shuttle continues to operate at this station until the SkyLink opens.
- June 7 – Border Czar Tom Homan announces the National Guard will be deployed in response to protests in Los Angeles.
- June 8:
  - The city of Glendale announces it will no longer allow ICE to hold federal detainees in its jail.
  - More than 150 people are arrested during an anti-ICE protest in San Francisco.
  - A small plane crashes off the coast of San Diego, killing all six occupants.

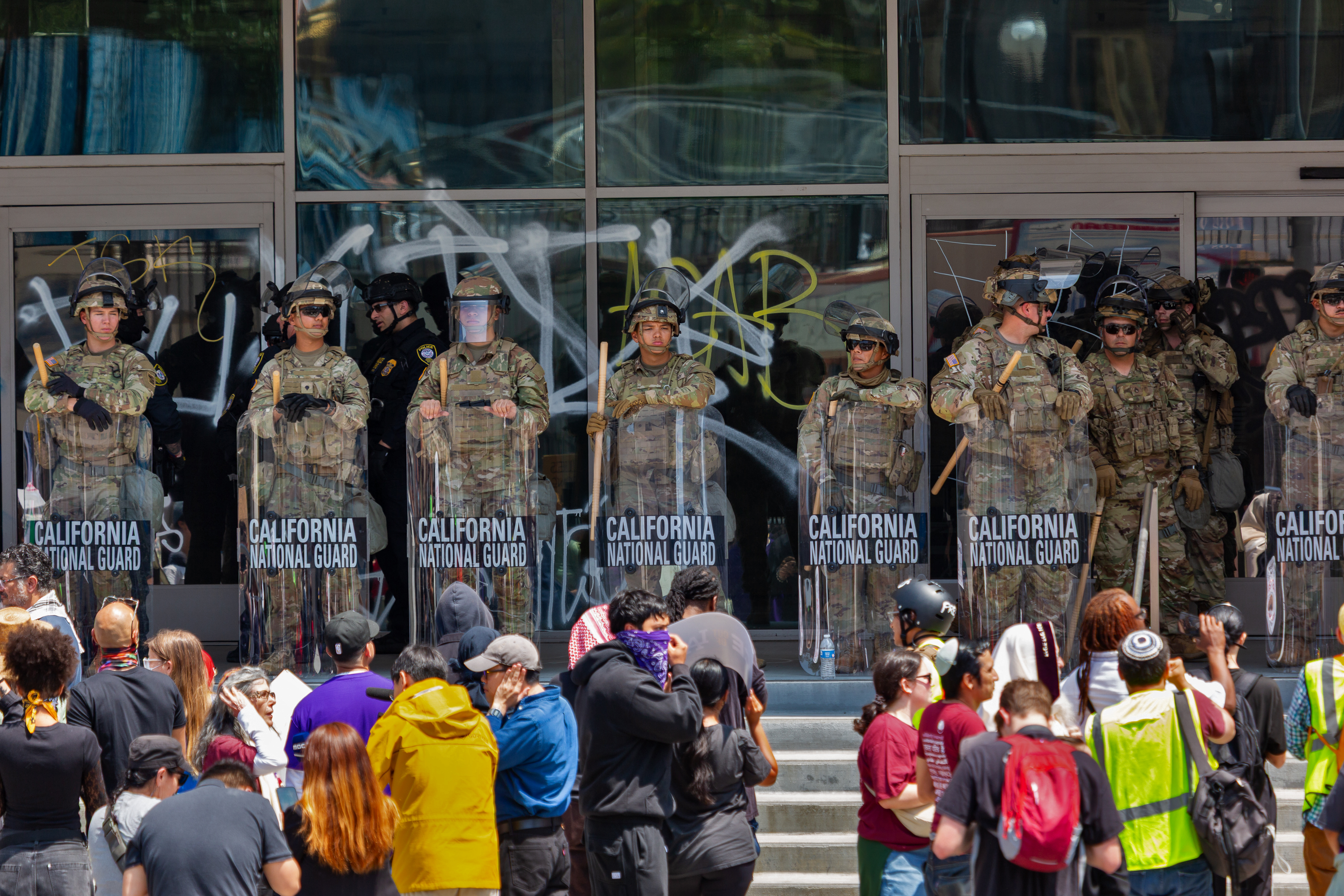
June 9: The California National Guard and protesters in Los Angeles.

- June 9:
  - California Attorney General Rob Bonta says the state of California will sue President Trump over his decision to federalize California National Guard troops in Los Angeles.
  - The United States Northern Command says it will move 700 Marines to the Los Angeles area in response to protests.
- June 12 – Senator Alex Padilla is forcibly removed from a news conference held by DHS Secretary Kristi Noem in Los Angeles.
- June 14 – July 6: 2025 CONCACAF Gold Cup in the Western United States, including California.
- June 19 – The Los Angeles Dodgers report that they blocked ICE agents from entering Dodger Stadium in Los Angeles. The Department of Homeland Security disputes this, saying the agents were from Customs and Border Protection and that they did not attempt to enter.
- June 20 – A panel of three federal judges in the Ninth Circuit rules that Trump is allowed to keep the California National Guard under federal control.
- June 21 – A boat with ten occupants capsizes on the California side of Lake Tahoe. Eight people are killed and two are rescued.
- June 28 – Governor Gavin Newsom sues Fox News for defamation, accusing the network of knowingly airing false information about a phone call he had with Trump over the National Guard being sent to Los Angeles.
- June 29 – The Wolf Fire begins.
- June 30 – The Trump administration sues the city of Los Angeles, claiming they refuse to cooperate with immigration enforcement.

=== July ===
- July 1 – A fireworks warehouse in Esparto is destroyed by explosions, killing seven people, damaging several nearby homes, and causing a vegetation fire.
- July 2:
  - Former WBC middleweight champion Julio César Chávez Jr. is arrested by U.S. Immigration and Customs Enforcement at his home in Studio City, Los Angeles due to allegations of Chávez Jr's connections with the Sinaloa Cartel, which the U.S. has designated a Foreign Terrorist Organization.
  - The University of California system says student governments are banned from boycotting foreign countries, including Israel.
- July 7 – Dozens of federal officers and about 90 members of the National Guard are deployed to a largely-empty MacArthur Park in Los Angeles.
- July 9 – Thirty-one workers are rescued when a Tunnel boring machine partially collapses an industrial tunnel in the Los Angeles Neighborhood of Wilmington.
- July 10 – 2025 Camarillo, California ICE raid: Immigration agents raid a farm near Camarillo, arresting around 200 people and sparking protests. During the raid, farmworker Jaime Garcia falls off a building and dies from his injuries. During the subsequent protests, a man is filmed appearing to fire a weapon at federal agents.
- July 14 – American Idol producer Robin Kaye and her husband Thomas Deluca are killed in their Encino, Los Angeles home during a suspected burglary.
- July 18 – Three Los Angeles County Sheriff's deputies are killed in an explosion at a training center in East Los Angeles.
- July 19 – 36 people are injured when a car drives into pedestrians outside a club on Santa Monica Boulevard in East Hollywood. The driver of the vehicle is beaten and shot by bystanders.
- July 20 – Richard Tillman, brother of NFL player-turned U.S. Army ranger Pat Tillman, intentionally drives into a post office in San Jose before setting his car on fire. He pleads guilty to federal charges in 2026.
- July 27 – Three people are killed when a Beech 95-B55 Baron aircraft crashes into the ocean near Point Pinos Lighthouse in Pacific Grove.
- July 31 – The federal government suspends federal research funding to the University of California, Los Angeles over claims of antisemetism.

=== August ===
- August 1 – The Gifford Fire begins.
- August 2 – The World Dog Surfing Championships are held at Pacifica State Beach.
- August 6 – Using a fake job offer, ICE lures 16 immigrants to a Westlake, Los Angeles Home Depot parking lot and arrests them. Penske, whose rental truck was used to transport ICE agents to the operation, releases a statement saying Penske guidelines prohibit using the back of their trucks to transport people and requesting DHS refrain from doing so.
- August 7 – The Canyon Fire begins.
- August 14 – A man is struck and killed by a car on the highway while fleeing an ICE raid at a Home Depot in Monrovia.
- August 15 – DHS arrests a tow truck driver in Los Angeles for towing an ICE vehicle as agents arrested a woman from Colombia.
- August 16 – Two CBP agents fire at a vehicle as it drives away in San Bernardino. No injuries are reported.
- August 19 – An El Dorado County resident in the Lake Tahoe area tests positive for bubonic plague.
- August 21 – Grammy-winning musician Lil Nas X is arrested in Los Angeles after being reported for walking on Ventura Boulevard in his underwear. He is later charged with battery on a police officer and resisting arrest.

=== September ===
- September 2 – A federal judge rules Trump's deployment of military troops to Los Angeles was unlawful and bars troops from aiding in immigration arrests.
- September 3
  - Jasveen Sangha, a drug dealer known as the "Ketamine Queen", pleads guilty to selling ketamine to actor Matthew Perry, resulting in his death. She is the fifth and final defendant to plead guilty in relation to Perry's death.
  - California, Oregon, and Washington announce the formation of the West Coast Health Alliance to take over some of the CDC's former functions.
- September 4 – The University of California, Berkeley gives federal authorities the names of 160 students and faculty named in an antisemitism probe.
- September 8 – The dismembered body of missing teenager Celeste Rivas is found in the trunk of a Tesla car owned by musician d4vd. Her death is being investigated as a homicide.
- September 14 – The 77th Primetime Emmy Awards are held at the Peacock Theater in Los Angeles, honoring the best in prime time television programming from June 2024 to May 2025.
- September 19 – The Los Angeles Metro A Line is extended 9 miles (14 km) east to Pomona with four new stations.
- September 20 – Governor Newsom signs a bill that bans most law enforcement officers from wearing masks during official duties. The law applies to federal law enforcement, though it is unclear how the state would enforce this.
- September 22 – A 4.3 magnitude earthquake strikes the San Francisco Bay Area, with the center being east-southeast of Berkeley.

=== October ===
- October 2 – A large explosion occurs at a processing unit at the Chevron refinery in El Segundo.
- October 5 – Newsom's office says the Trump administration is sending 300 members of the California National Guard to Portland, Oregon despite a judge blocking him from sending Oregon National Guard members the day prior.
- October 6 – A former staffer of LA mayor Karen Bass is sentenced to one year of probation for a fake bomb threat at City Hall in 2024.
- October 8 - A woman kills her two daughters, 9 and 12, her husband, and then herself in a house in San Francisco's Westwood Highlands neighborhood. Police believe their house foreclosing was one of the motivating factors behind the murders and suicide. The deaths, as of November 2025, are still under investigation by forensics personnel.

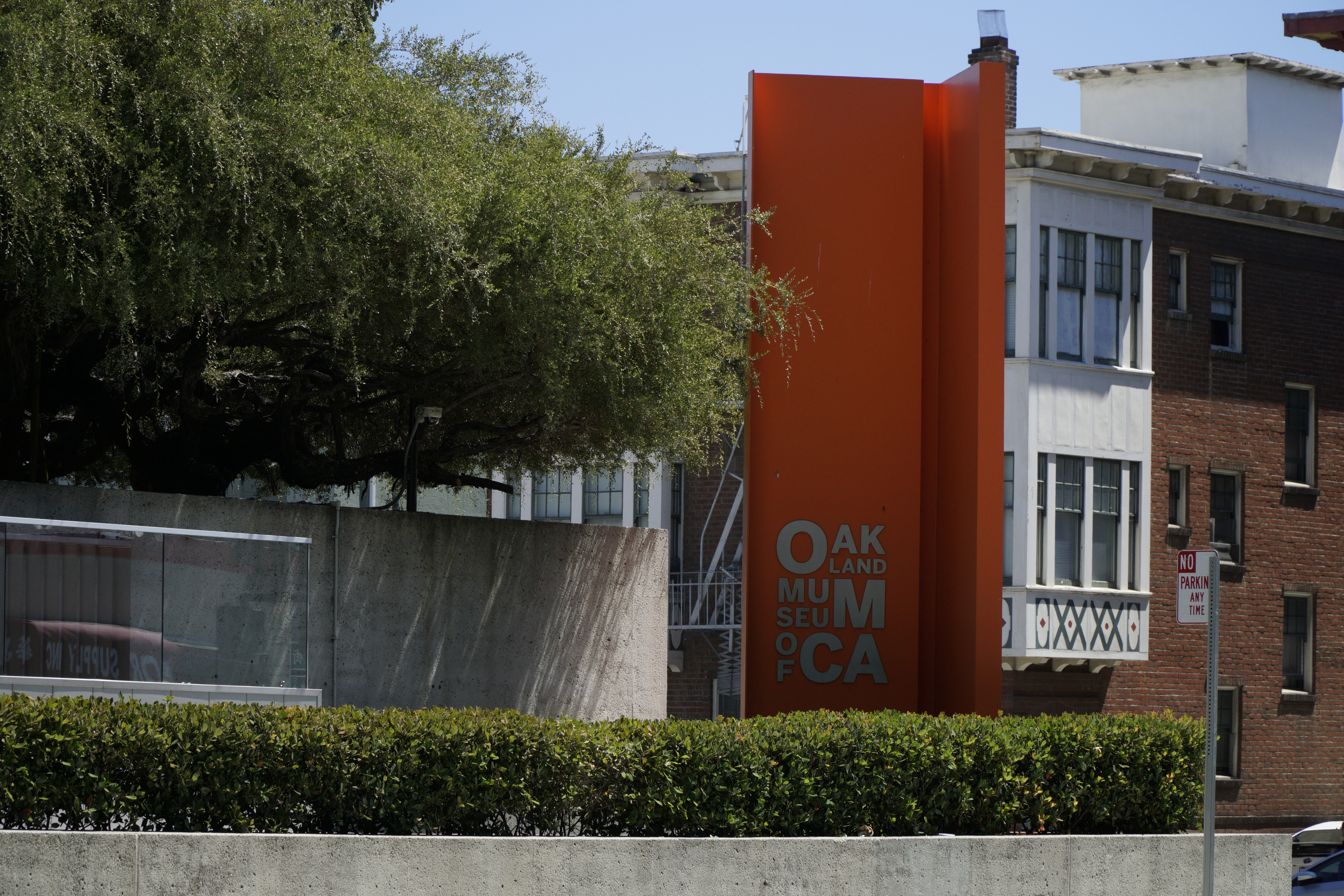
October 15: Over 1,000 items are stolen from the Oakland Museum of California (pictured).

- October 15 – Over 1,000 items are stolen from a storage facility for the Oakland Museum of California.
- October 18 – The Marine Corps fire live artillery over Interstate 5 from Camp Pendleton. Metal shrapnel from an artillery shell falls and hits a California Highway Patrol car.
- October 21 – An ICE agent shoots a man in the elbow during a traffic stop in Los Angeles. The bullet ricochets and hits a deputy U.S. Marshal.
- October 22 – The U.S. Coast Guard begins providing a base of operations for CBP agents in Alameda.
- October 23
  - Coast Guard officers fired 50 rounds at a U-Haul truck that attempted to slowly back into officers whom were posted at a dead-end street by the Coast Guard Base in Alameda. The driver and a bystander are injured.
  - Trump announces he will not deploy troops to San Francisco following a conversation with Mayor Daniel Lurie.
- October 27 – KitKat, a bodega cat in the Mission District of San Francisco, is struck and killed by a self-driving Waymo car.
- October 30 – ICE agents shoot a man in the shoulder during a traffic stop for a different man in Ontario. DHS claims the man, a U.S. citizen, attempted to intervene in the stop and tried to hit agents with his car.

=== November ===
- November 1 – The Los Angeles Dodgers defeat the Toronto Blue Jays 4–3 in Game 7 of the 2025 World Series, winning back-to-back titles.
- November 4 – Californians pass California Proposition 50, which allows the state to replace the current congressional district map drawn by the California Citizens Redistricting Commission with a new, legislature-drawn map to be used until 2032.
- November 13 – The Department of Justice joins a lawsuit filed by the California Republican Party seeking to block California's new congressional maps.
- November 14 – Four people are killed and four injured when a boat believed to be carrying migrants capsizes near Imperial Beach.
- November 21 – A container ship catches fire at the Port of Los Angeles.
- November 29 – Four people are killed and eleven injured after a shooting at a banquet hall in Stockton.

=== December ===
- December 5 – The city of San Diego agrees to pay $30 million to the family of Konoa Wilson, who was killed by a San Diego Police officer in January. The settlement is believed to be the largest for a police killing in U.S. history, surpassing the $27 million paid to George Floyd's family in 2021.

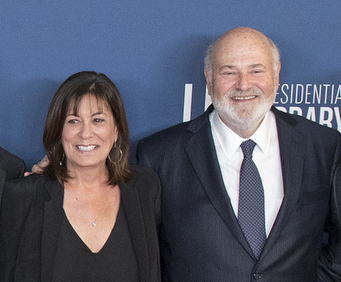
December 14: Rob Reiner and Michele Singer (pictured) are stabbed to death in their Los Anfeles home.

- December 14 – Director Rob Reiner and his wife Michele Singer are stabbed to death in their Los Angeles home. Their son Nick Reiner is arrested and charged with murder.
- December 19 – A tow truck driver who was charged with stealing an ICE vehicle in by towing it in South Los Angeles in August is found not guilty.
- December 20 – A power outage leaves about 130,000 San Francisco residents without power.
- December 31
  - Trump says he is dropping his push to deploy National Guard troops in Los Angeles, as well as Chicago and Portland.
  - An off-duty ICE agent fatally shoots Keith Porter in Northridge, Los Angeles.
