= 2027 in California =

- Decades: 2000s; 2010s; 2020s
- See also: History of California; Historical outline of California; List of years in California; 2027 in the United States

Events in the year 2027 in California.

== Events ==
=== Planned or predicted ===
- January 1 - 2027 Rose Bowl
- February 7 - 69th Annual Grammy Awards
- February 14 - Super Bowl LXI
- March 14 - 99th Academy Awards
- Spring:
  - Further Triennial
  - OC Streetcar
