= 2023 in California =

- Decades: 2000s; 2010s; 2020s
- See also: History of California; Historical outline of California; List of years in California; 2023 in the United States

The year 2023 in California involved several major events.

== Incumbents ==
- Governor: Gavin Newsom (D)
- Lieutenant Governor: Eleni Kounalakis (D)
- Chief Justice:
  - Tani Cantil-Sakauye (until January 2)
  - Patricia Guerrero (starting January 2)
- Senate president pro tempore: Toni Atkins (D)
- Speaker of the Assembly:
  - Anthony Rendon (D) (until June 30)
  - Robert A. Rivas (D) (starting June 30)

== Culture ==
=== Media ===
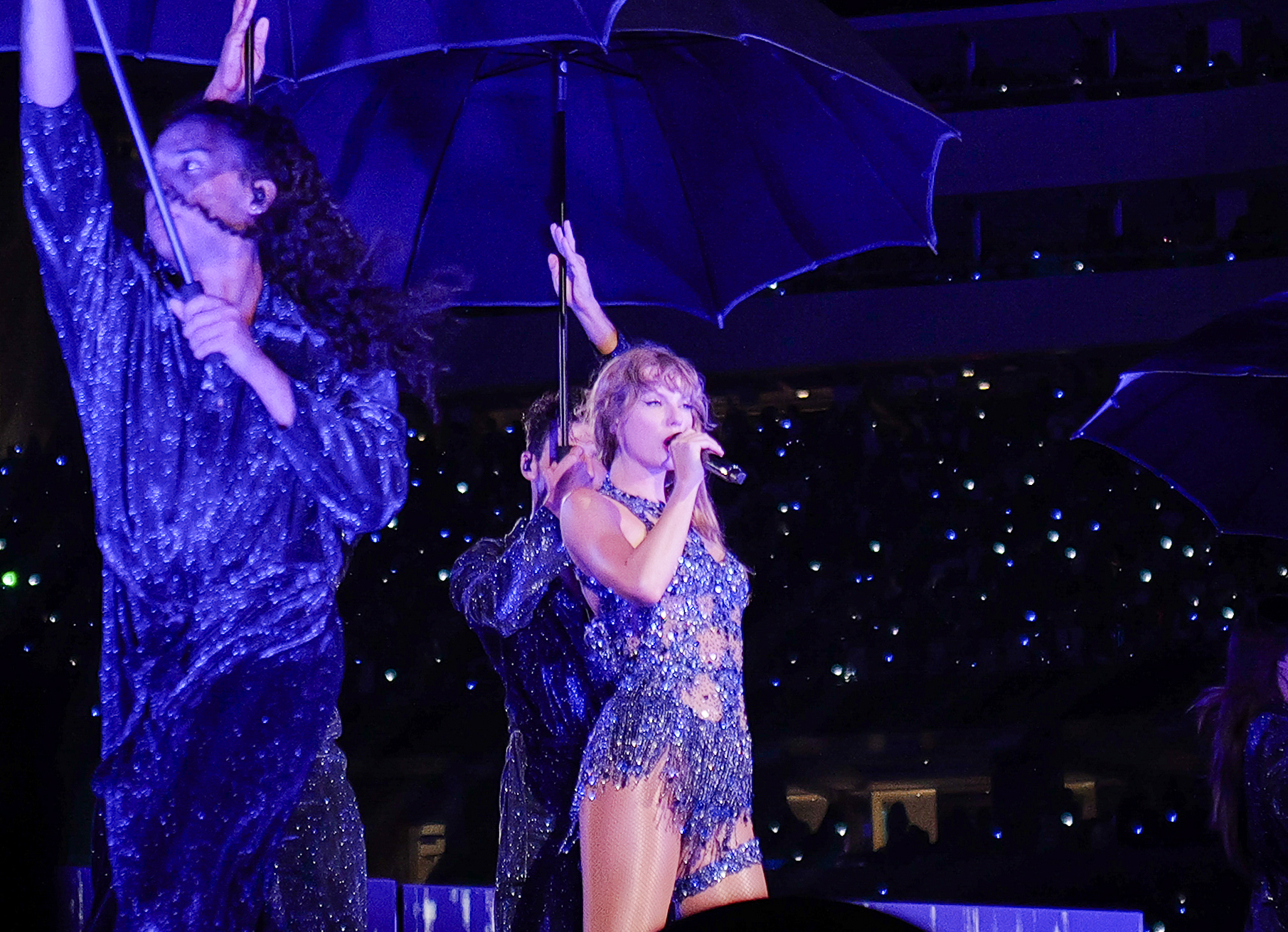
Singer-songwriter Taylor Swift performing at SoFi Stadium in August 2023

The Eras Tour, singer-songwriter Taylor Swift's sixth concert tour, generated significant revenue for Los Angeles. The California Center for Jobs and the Economy determined that Swift's performances in the city, prolonged over six days, generated US$320 million for Los Angeles County, or enough revenue to fund 3,300 additional jobs. During the final performance of her tour in Los Angeles, Swift announced 1989 (Taylor's Version). The Eras Tour occurred concurrently with a hotel worker strike in Los Angeles. Striking hotel employees urged Swift to postpone her concerts in Los Angeles. Taylor Swift: The Eras Tour, a concert film documenting the tour, was filmed during three performances of The Eras Tour in Los Angeles; the film grossed US$250 million worldwide. The Eras Tour was honored with a proclamation naming Swift as an honorary mayor of Santa Clara and temporarily renaming the city to "Swiftie Clara". San Francisco supervisor Matt Dorsey proposed declaring July 28 and 29—the dates of Swift's Santa Clara concerts—as "Taylor Swift Weekend".

=== Sports ===
In the 2022 NFL season, the Los Angeles Chargers and San Francisco 49ers advanced to the Wild Card playoffs. The Chargers lost to the Jacksonville Jaguars 31–30 when placekicker Riley Patterson kicked a 36-yard field goal after leading by 27 points. The 49ers advanced to the NFC Championship Game before losing to the Philadelphia Eagles 31–7 after quarterback Brock Purdy suffered an injury, allowing the Eagles to face the Kansas City Chiefs in Super Bowl LVII.

== Health ==
In February 2023, California ended its COVID-19 state of emergency. COVID-19 cases in the state increased in August due to increased travel, waning immunity, and the eroding of precautions. Cases decreased in October; health officials continued to encourage vaccinations to avert a "tripledemic".

== Politics and law ==
=== National politics ===
Concerns over senator Dianne Feinstein's health and mental competence intensified in 2023, furthered by the 2024 Senate election. In January, representatives Katie Porter and Adam Schiff announced that they would run for the Senate seat held by Feinstein. On February 14, Feinstein stated that she would not seek reelection. Representative Barbara Lee declared her campaign a week later. The campaigns of Porter, Schiff, and Lee represent a progressive shift in the California Democratic Party, congressional representation from areas of California outside of the San Francisco Bay Area, and demographic changes reflecting the increase population of Hispanics and Latinos in California. Feinstein was hospitalized for shingles that month. The New York Times reported in May that shingles had spread to her face and neck, causing facial paralysis, and that Feinstein had contracted encephalitis. On September 29, Feinstein died. Under California law, Newsom is granted the authority to appoint a successor and announced that EMILY's List president Laphonza Butler would serve as California's junior senator on October 1. Butler will not run for reelection in 2024. Feinstein lay in state at San Francisco City Hall, and a memorial was held for her on October 5.

=== Law ===
A law decriminalizing jaywalking took effect on January 1.

== Events ==
- January 1 – A 5.4 M_{w} earthquake hits Rio Dell as an aftershock of the 2022 Ferndale earthquake, damaging structures.
- January 2 – 2023 Rose Bowl: The Penn State Nittany Lions defeat the Utah Utes 35–21, winning their second Rose Bowl title.
- January 4 – Governor Gavin Newsom declares a state of emergency amid a second deluge of flooding.
- January 21 – 2023 Monterey Park shooting: A gunman opens fire at a dance studio in Monterey Park, killing eleven people and injuring nine others, before driving to a ballroom. Computer programmer Brandon Tsay disarms the gunman before he flees and kills himself the following day in Torrance.
- January 23 – 2023 Half Moon Bay shootings: A spree shooting occurs at two farms in Half Moon Bay, killing seven people and injuring another person.
- January 28 – Three people are killed and four others are wounded in a mass shooting in Beverly Crest, Los Angeles.
- March 10 – Collapse of Silicon Valley Bank: Silicon Valley Bank, a lender specializing in the technology industry and a regional bank in the San Francisco Bay Area, files for bankruptcy following a bank run.
- June 16 – Regional Connector: The Los Angeles Metro commences passenger service on the new light rail tunnel connecting A and E lines beneath Downtown Los Angeles to the former L Line.
- December 31 – Representative Kevin McCarthy resigns, ending his sixteen year-long tenure.
