= 1947 in California =

- Decades: 1920s; 1930s; 1940s; 1950s; 1960s
- See also: History of California; Historical outline of California; List of years in California; 1947 in the United States

The year 1947 in California involved the following events.

== Incumbents ==
- Governor: Earl Warren (R)
- Lieutenant Governor:
  - Frederick F. Houser (R) (until January 6)
  - Goodwin J. Knight (R) (starting January 7)
- Chief Justice: Phil S. Gibson
- Senate president pro tempore: Charles W. Lyon (R)
- Speaker of the Assembly: Sam L. Collins (R)

== Crime ==
- January 15: Elizabeth Short, later known as the Black Dahlia, is found murdered in Los Angeles. The case remains unsolved.

== Events ==
- October 14:
  - The Los Angeles County Air Pollution Control District is created by the Los Angeles County Board of Supervisors. It becomes the first air pollution control program in the United States.
  - Chuck Yeager becomes the first confirmed person to break the sound barrier at an altitude of 42,000 ft (12,800 m) over the Rogers Dry Lake of the Mojave Desert.
- October 20: The televised Hollywood Ten hearings begin before the House Un-American Activities Committee (HUAC) in Washington, D.C., having a chilling effect on the film industry in California. After the hearings, the Hollywood blacklist emerged. Coverage of social issues by Hollywood studios precipitously declined from 28% in 1947 to 18% in 1949, to 9% by 1954.
