= 1995 in California =

- Decades: 1970s; 1980s; 1990s; 2000s; 2010s
- See also: History of California; Historical outline of California; List of years in California; 1995 in the United States

The year 1995 in California involved the following events.

== Incumbents ==
- Governor: Pete Wilson (R)
- Lieutenant Governor:
  - Leo T. McCarthy (D) (until January 2)
  - Gray Davis (D) (starting January 2)
- Chief Justice: Malcolm Lucas
- Senate president pro tempore: Bill Lockyer (D)
- Speaker of the Assembly:
  - Willie Brown (D) (until June 5)
  - Doris Allen (R) (June 5 – September 14)
  - Brian Setencich (R) (starting September 14)

== Events ==
- January 2 – Pete Wilson is inaugurated for a 2nd term as Governor after winning reelection in the 1994 Gubernatorial election.
- January 24 – Murder trial of O. J. Simpson: The criminal trial of O. J. Simpson for the murder of his ex-wife Nicole Brown Simpson and her friend Ronald Goldman begins.
- March 2 – Yahoo! is incorporated in Sunnyvale.
- March 27 – 67th Academy Awards: Robert Zemeckis's Forrest Gump leads the nominations with thirteen, winning six, including Best Picture, Best Director for Zemeckis, and Best Actor for Tom Hanks.
- April 13 – The National Football League approves the Los Angeles Rams's move to St. Louis, Missouri, playing as the St. Louis Rams until relocating back in 2016.
- April 24 – Timber lobbyist Gilbert Murray is killed by Ted Kaczynski in Sacramento, in the final bombing Kaczynski carried out before turning himself in September.
- May 17 – 1995 San Diego tank rampage: Shawn Nelson, a 35-year-old U.S. Army veteran and unemployed plumber, stole an M60A3 Patton tank from a National Guard armory and went on a destructive rampage through the streets of San Diego.
- June 28 – Ted Kaczynski sends a letter to San Francisco Chronicle threatening to detonate an airplane departing from Los Angeles International Airport before sending a letter to The New York Times claiming the scheme was a prank.
- July 11 – The National Football League approves the Las Vegas Raiders's move to Oakland, playing as the Oakland Raiders until relocating back in 2020.
- July 20 – The Regents of the University of California vote to abolish affirmative action.
- October 3 – O.J. Simpson is acquitted in the murder of Nicole Brown Simpson and Ronald Goldman, causing polarized reactions.
- November 20 – U.S. district judge Mariana Pfaelzer strikes down Proposition 187, an anti-immigration law.
- December 15 – AltaVista is founded in Palo Alto.
