= Food Allergy Research & Education =

Non-profit organization based in US

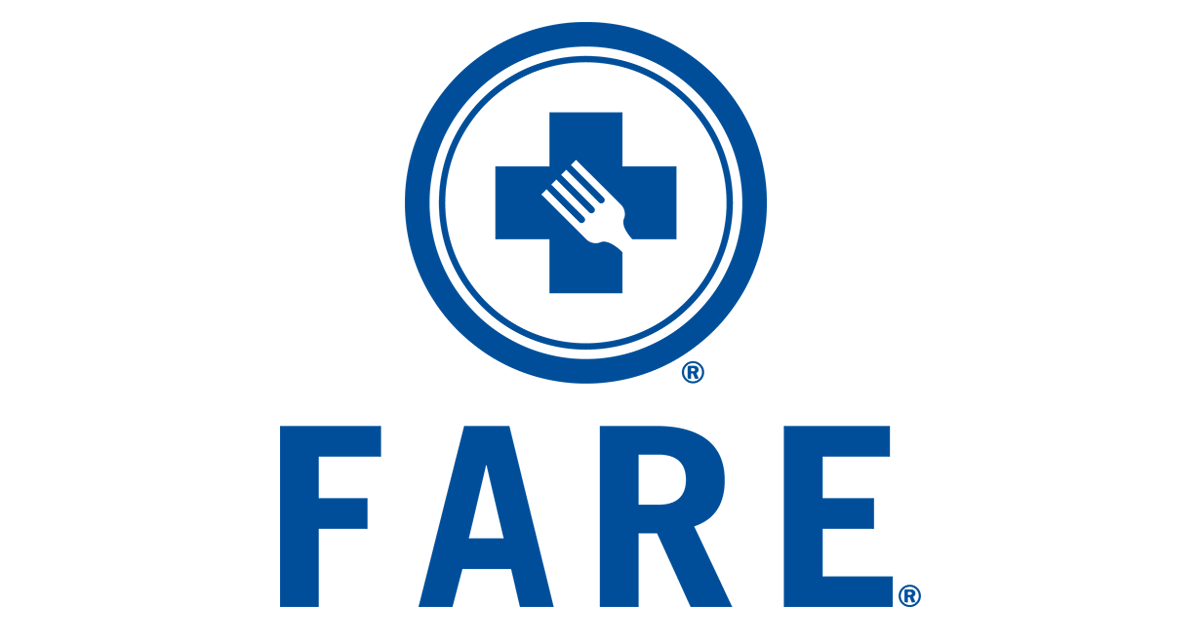
- Founded: 2012; established through merger of the Food Allergy & Anaphylaxis Network (est.1991) and the Food Allergy Initiative (est. 1998)
- Purpose: Food allergies
- Location: McLean, Virginia, United States
- Region served: United States
- Method: Research, Education, Awareness, Advocacy
- CEO: Sung Poblete
- Revenue: $18,707,655 USD (for year ending December 31, 2020)
- Website: www.foodallergy.org

Food Allergy Research & Education (FARE) is a U.S.-based nonprofit organization focused on food allergy–related advocacy, public education, and support programs. The organization develops informational materials about food allergies and anaphylaxis and conducts initiatives aimed at increasing public awareness. FARE also supports research efforts related to treatment and diagnosis of food allergies. Various estimates suggest that food allergies affect approximately 32 million people in the United States, and the organization works within this public health context.

FARE was formed in 2012 through the merger of two U.S.-based food allergy patient advocacy organizations: the Food Allergy & Anaphylaxis Network (FAAN) and the Food Allergy Initiative (FAI). FAAN, a nonprofit organization founded in 1991, focused on providing educational resources about food allergies and anaphylaxis at a time when public information on these conditions was limited. FAI, established in 1998 by parents and family members of individuals with food allergies, concentrated on supporting and funding food allergy–related research.

Following the merger, FARE consolidated the educational, advocacy, and research activities of the two organizations. According to organizational reports, by 2022 FARE had allocated approximately $100 million to programs related to food allergy research, education, and advocacy.

== Research ==
FARE has established research infrastructure intended to support the study, management, and prevention of food allergy. Initiated in 2015 and expanded in 2020, the FARE Clinical Network is a consortium of academic, research, and clinical care centers focused on food allergy. As of 2021, 51 FARE Clinical Network centers reported conducting more than 45 food allergy–related clinical trials and providing care to approximately 250,000 patients across 23 U.S. states and the District of Columbia.

FARE has also developed a food allergy patient registry, as well as a biobank and biorepository, and a data coordination center to support research conducted within the FARE Clinical Network.

FARE co-funded the Learning Early About Peanut Allergy (LEAP) study, published in 2015, which informed subsequent updates to national dietary guidance recommending the introduction of age-appropriate peanut-containing foods during infancy to reduce the risk of peanut allergy. Following the publication of the LEAP study, updated guidelines supporting earlier introduction of peanut-containing foods were issued by organizations including the American Academy of Pediatrics and the National Institute of Allergy and Infectious Diseases.

FARE-supported research has also examined early introduction of multiple food allergens, approaches to desensitization using allergen-specific immunotherapy and non-specific medications, and methods of food allergy diagnosis. In the early 2020s, FARE launched the Start Eating Early Diet (SEED) initiative, in collaboration with researchers at Northwestern University, to study early dietary introduction of multiple allergens. Research on early introduction has shown varying results across different allergens, with evidence strongest for peanut and emerging data for egg allergy prevention.

== Education and awareness ==
Educational materials developed by FARE help patients and families manage and mitigate allergen exposure risk while easing the stress and anxiety associated with this life-changing and potentially life-threatening disease. FARE's cross-channel resources include online training courses, e-learning and in-person events, food service certification, and a college search tool to help prospective students with food allergies compare the dining and other campus accommodations available for food-allergic students are more than 1,100 colleges and universities. FARE has developed resources to educate and inform children, teens and adults with food allergies, their families and caregivers, educators and school staff serving all ages and grade levels, food service workers, healthcare providers, and the research community.

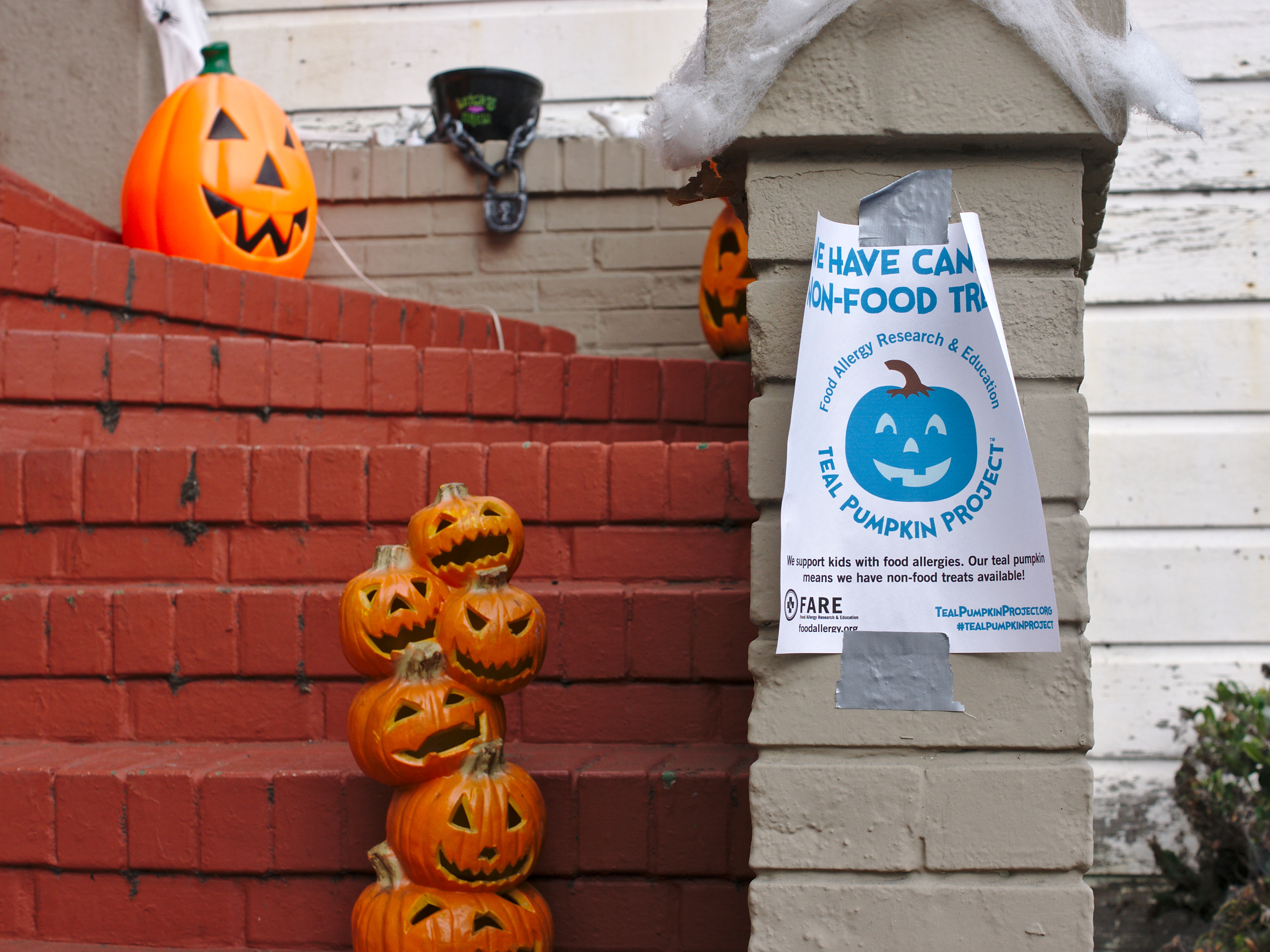
Teal Pumpkin Flyer on display at a house in San Francisco

Through media and awareness programs, FARE helps people better understand the daily challenges of managing food allergies. Since 2014, FARE has promoted the Teal Pumpkin Project to make Halloween festivities safe and fun for children with food allergies and other dietary restrictions. Originating as Halloween-themed food allergy awareness activity of the Food Allergy Community of East Tennessee (FACET) support group, the Teal Pumpkin Project encourages households to display a teal pumpkin and offer non-food treats in a separate bowl, so that children who can't safely touch or consume food-based treats can participate in trick-or-treating. Households that participate in the Teal Pumpkin Project are located throughout the U.S. and in other countries and territories worldwide.

FARE's legacy organization, FAAN, initiated Food Allergy Awareness Week in 1998. Food Allergy Awareness Week is commemorated each year during the second week in May.

== Advocacy ==
Through the efforts of a community of more than 65,000 grassroots food allergy advocates, FARE organizes support policies that have a positive impact on members of the food allergy community. On the national level, FARE was instrumental in the passage of the Food Allergen Labeling and Consumer Protection Act of 2004 (FALCPA). As a result of FALCPA, the presence of eight major food allergens (milk, egg, wheat, soy, finned fish, crustacean shellfish, peanuts, and tree nuts) must be indicated, in simple terms, on packaged food items. FARE was also central in advocating for the Food Allergy Safety, Treatment, Education and Research Act of 2021 (FASTER), which passed both houses of Congress with overwhelming bipartisan support. Starting in 2023, the FASTER Act will require that sesame be labeled in plain language on packaged goods as the ninth major food allergen.

Additional areas of FARE's advocacy focus include access to epinephrine, the only treatment that can halt symptoms of the severe allergic reaction called anaphylaxis; bringing in school policies to protect the safety of food-allergic students; increased federal funding for food allergy research; access to safe foods, specialized food allergy care and opportunities to participate in research for food-allergic individuals living in underserved and under-resourced communities.

== See also ==
- Food allergy in the United States
- Anaphylaxis
- Peanut allergy
- Type I hypersensitivity
- Alpha-Gal allergy
- Zacky Muñoz
