= 1850 in California =

- Decades: 1840s; 1850s; 1860s; 1870s
- See also: History of California; Historical outline of California; List of years in California; 1850 in the United States

The following is list of events of the year 1850 in California.

== Incumbents ==
- Governor: Peter Hardeman Burnett (starting September 9)

== Events ==
- April 4 - Los Angeles is incorporated as a city in California.
- April 15 - San Francisco is incorporated as a city in California.
- September 9 - California is admitted to the Union as the 31st state as a result of the California Statehood Act.

=== Ongoing ===
- California gold rush (1848-1855)
