= Rescue California =

Political committee behind the 2003 California gubernatorial recall election

Rescue California was the political committee that orchestrated the 2003 recall election of California Governor Gray Davis. It was primarily funded by Congressman Darrell Issa (Republican-California).
