= October 2025 El Segundo fire =

Industrial disaster in California, United States

Coordinates: 33.9061°N 118.4041°W

At 9:30 p.m. PDT on 2 October 2025 a massive explosion occurred and large fireball erupted in the jet fuel unit of the Chevron refinery in El Segundo, California. The refinery, which supplies a fifth of all motor vehicle fuels and 40% of the jet fuel consumed in Southern California, is the largest on the West Coast. Residents likened the blast to an earthquake and even a "nuke".

The Chevron El Segundo has its own fire department, etc.; the Los Angeles County Fire Department assisted. Air quality was expected to worsen, no evacuations were ordered—the fire was soon contained—and operations at Los Angeles International Airport (LAX) were not affected. Amateur footage of the spectacular event quickly went viral. The fire was visible for miles across the South Bay, and traffic was diverted.
