= 2024 University of California academic workers' strike =

Labor dispute at the University of California

- Date: May 20, 2024 – June 7, 2024
- Location: California, United States
- Caused by: The 2024 University of California, Los Angeles pro-Palestinian campus occupation clearing
- Goals: Resolution of unfair labor practice charges; Negotiations with UC pro-Palestine encampments; Free speech protections; Divestment from corporations profiting from war in Gaza; Disclosure of university investments; Transitioning out of research funding Palestinian oppression
- Result: Temporary Restraining Order against the strike for the remainder of the strike period.

Parties
United Auto Workers Local 4811	University of California

The 2024 University of California academic workers' strike was a labor strike at several University of California campuses. The unions representing student teachers, academic researchers, postdoctoral scholars, and lab scientists stated that University of California administrators had violated their union contracts by calling police to end campus Gaza solidarity encampments. The strike was set to take place from May 20, 2024, until June 30, 2024—but was cut short by a court order on June 7, 2024.

== Background ==
=== University of California, Los Angeles pro-Palestinian campus occupation ===
At UCLA, teaching assistants, post-docs, and academic researchers went on strike in protest of the university's handling of a violent mob attack on pro-Palestinian students.

=== Strike authorization ===
On May 6, 2024, UAW Local 4811 announced that it would call a strike authorization vote following its filing of unfair labor practice charges against the University of California, in which it would advocate for workers to vote "yes" on authorization. These charges argued that the university has endangered workers at UCLA by allowing them to be attacked by counter-protestors during the campus occupation. 19,780 of the approximately 48,000 union-represented workers voted in the referendum, held from May 13–15, 2024, on whether to authorize the union's executive board to call a strike. 79% of participants voted in favor. On May 15, 2024, the union's executive board officially called for workers to strike. The "stand up" strike, modeled on the 2023 United Auto Workers strike, would call UC campuses to strike on a rolling basis, beginning with University of California, Santa Cruz.

=== Legality and injunction attempts ===
The university attempted twice to break the strike through the process outlined in the 1978 California Higher Education Employer-Employee Relations Act, filing complaints with the California Public Relations Board. The union's counsel successfully argued against these injunction attempts in a defense resting on the precedent set in the Mastro Plastics Corp. vs. Labor Board (1956) Supreme Court ruling. Where the university interpreted the unions contract as disallowing strikes before the end of the contract, whereas the union held that Mastro Plastics allowed for strikes in protest of unresolved unfair labor practice charges.

== Strike expansions ==
=== Santa Cruz ===
The Santa Cruz campus was the first called to participate in the strike and around 1,500 workers walked off the job on May 20, 2024.

=== Los Angeles and Davis ===
On May 28, 2024, the union expanded the strike to the university's Los Angeles and Davis campuses, adding approximately 12,000 more workers to the action and seriously hampering the university's ability to continue its educational and research functions, taking place just two weeks before the end of the academic quarter. These additions to the strike were motivated in-part by the clearing of additional pro-Palestine encampments on UC campuses in San Diego and Irvine.

=== San Diego and Santa Barbara ===
On June 3, 2024, workers at UC San Diego and UC Santa Barbara joined the strike with, respectively, 8,000 and 3,000 additional academic workers.

=== Irvine ===
On June 5, 2024, 5,000 workers at UC Irvine joined the strike, largely motivated by the arrest of students, staff, and union members at the clearing of the Irvine pro-Palestine encampment. The expansion of the strike to Irvine—located in Orange County—allowed the university to file against the union in Orange County Superior Court, after forum shopping for a judge friendly to their legal position, ultimately halting the strike.

== Court order ==
On June 7, 2024, Orange County Superior Court Judge Randall J. Sherman ordered the Union to halt its strike due to it causing damage to students' education. UC lawyers brought the suit arguing the strike was causing "irreparable harm" to students' education before their final exams. Though all strike activity was halted on June 7, strike was officially resolved on June 25, 2024, when the university agreed to drop its injunction request.
