= Zacky Muñoz =

American author and food allergy advocate (born 2012)

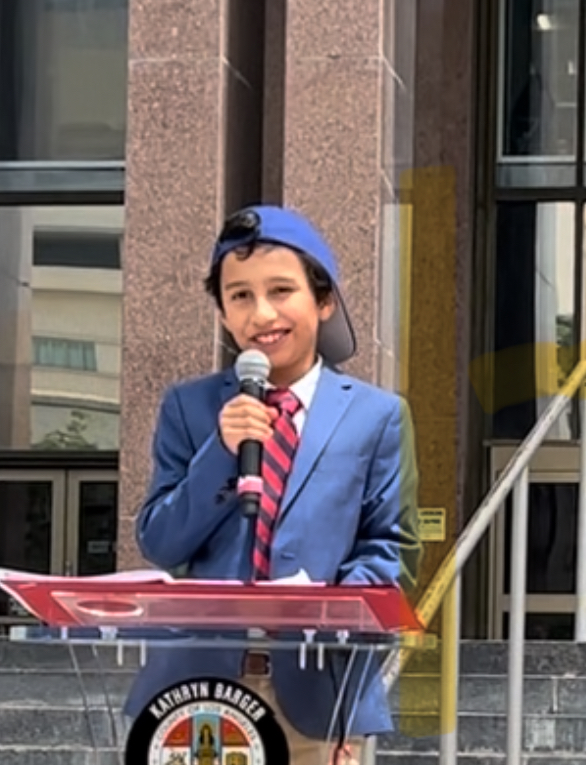
- Muñoz speaks in 2023 about the passage of a California law
- Born: 2012 (age 13–14)
- Known for: The Zacky Bill; Muñoz SAFE Act

Zacky Muñoz (born 2012) is an American author and activist known for his food allergy awareness and advocacy.‍ He is the FARE Ambassador and the author of The Zacky Bill‍‍ and Muñoz SAFE Act, which became California state law in 2022 and 2023, respectively.‍‍‍

== Biography ==
Zacky Muñoz is the son of Priscilla and Zachary Muñoz with another younger male sibling.‍‍

Muñoz had suffered from eczema since birth and was diagnosed with allergies to nuts, sesame seeds, shellfish, legumes, and avocados. When he was in first grade, he had two anaphylactic reactions at school.‍‍‍ In the first incident he ate a breadstick sprinkled with sesame seeds.‍ The second was when the usual allergen-free croutons in his salad were switched to one with allergen. The two episodes spurred Zacky and his mother, Priscilla, to work on proposed laws that focused on food allergy safety in school.‍

== Assembly bills ==
=== Zacky Bill ===
The Zacky Bill, also known as Assembly Bill 2640, was passed by the California Legislature‍ and signed into California law by Governor Gavin Newsom in 2022.‍‍‍ This guide helps school administrators, nurses, staffs, and families navigate the daily calculations, options, and protections available to school children with food allergies.‍ The Zacky Bill is known as the California Resource Guide and is available on the California Department of Education website.‍

=== Muñoz SAFE Act ===
In 2023, Muñoz championed the Muñoz SAFE Act,‍ known as Assembly Bill 1651, which stands for Student Allergy Framework for Emergencies.‍ This bill requires schools to store epinephrine in an accessible location, like an EpiPen, and provide training to staff on how to use them. Muñoz advocated and lobbied for the bill throughout its passage through the California state legislature.‍

=== The Zacky FAST Act ===
In 2024, Muñoz introduced the Zacky Food Allergy Safety Treatment (FAST) Act, aimed at promoting food allergy safety in California.‍ This bill would provide schools with options to have the latest FDA-approved epinephrine delivery methods accessible to students with severe allergic reactions.‍ This includes epinephrine auto-injectors, nasal sprays, or other delivery systems.

== Food allergy advocacy and awareness ==
Muñoz is featured in food allergy series videos from FARE, such as Kids Cuisine Remix and Zacky's Kitchen,‍ and a Back-to-School campaign.‍ He was also seen on Arnold Schwarzenegger's social media outlets.‍‍

== Recognition ==
In 2023, Muñoz accepted a commendation from Supervisor Kathryn Barger in Los Angeles.‍

In December 2025, he was named a Time for Kids Service Star, a program by Time for Kids highlighting young people making a positive impact.

In 2026, he was included in the TIME Inaugural Visionary List.

== See also ==
- The Zacky Bill
