= Malissa Sherwood =

American mixed martial artist (1975/1976–2026)

Malissa Sherwood (1975 or 1976 – April 20, 2026) was an American mixed martial artist and wrestler.

== Life and career ==
Sherwood was born in Sacramento, California. She was described as a trailblazer in women’s grappling and combat sports.

She was an 8-time Senior US National Runner-Up, 8-time Senior World Team Runner-Up, and 2000 Pan American Champion.

Sherwood died from cancer on April 20, 2026, at the age of 50.
