= Killing of Rob Marquise Adams =

2022 shooting in California, US

- Date: July 16, 2022
- Time: 8:05 p.m.
- Location: 400 West Highland Avenue, San Bernardino, California
- Deaths: Rob Marquise Adams

On July 16, 2022, at around 8:05 p.m., officers from the San Bernardino Police Department fatally shot 23-year-old Rob Marquise Adams.

The state Attorney General's Office declined to investigate the shooting as Adams was not considered an unarmed civilian.

The attorney for the family questioned the official version of events.

An autopsy was funded by Colin Kaepernick's Autopsy Initiative.

The family of Rob Marquise Adams filed a wrongful death claim against the city of San Bernardino in December 2022. The city settled for US$4 million.
