= The Zacky Bill =

2022 California law

California State Legislature
- Long title: The Zacky Bill- AB 2640: Food Allergy Pupil Health: California Food Allergy Resource internet web page.
- Passed by: California Assembly
- Passed: 6/15/2022
- Passed by: California Senate
- Passed: 8/17/2022
- Signed: Signed into law on 9/29/2022

Legislative history

Initiating chamber: California Assembly
- Bill title: AB 2640
- Introduced by: Valladares

The Zacky Bill (AB 2640) is a California law requiring that food allergy information be made available to students. The law was written and championed by a 10-year-old Pasadena boy, Zacky Muñoz and his family, was signed into California law by Governor Newsom on September 29, 2022. It was filed with Secretary of State that same day. The law requires that the California Department of Education enacts a Resource Guide, made available on their website, for all students, especially those with food allergies and their parents/caregivers.

== Details of the Zacky Law ==
The text of the Law cites that the bill will be known as the ZACKY Bill and will add Ed Code 49414.2 to the existing Law. This code will ensure that the website contains pertinent information to protect students with food allergies, a health and safety initiative.

The Resource Website will include:

A. Methods of planning and strategies to decrease food induced reactions at school

B. Ways to obtain the ingredients list to school served lunches

C. Methods to establish Individualized Education Program Plan or Section 504 Plans for students

D. Other pertinent food allergy state and national resource
