= History of California =

History of the US state

The history of California has been divided into:

- History of California before 1900
- History of California (1900–present)

Other related articles include:

- Alta California § History
- Baja California § History
- Bibliography of California history
- Outline of California history
- Territorial evolution of California
- List of historical societies in California
  - History museums in California
- History of agriculture in California
- History of education in California
- Hispanics and Latinos in California
- Women's suffrage in California
- More specific place histories
  - History of Chico, California
  - History of Los Angeles
    - History of the San Fernando Valley
  - History of Piedmont, California
  - History of Riverside, California
  - History of Sacramento, California
  - History of San Bernardino, California
  - History of San Diego
  - History of San Francisco
    - Timeline of the San Francisco Bay Area
  - History of San Jose, California
  - History of Santa Ana, California
  - History of Santa Barbara, California
  - History of Santa Monica, California
