= Iglesia de Santiago =

Iglesia de Santiago may refer to:

- Iglesia de Santiago (A Coruña)
- Iglesia de Santiago (Arlós)
- Iglesia de Santiago (Benicalaf)
- Iglesia de Santiago (Gobiendes)
- Iglesia de Santiago (Jerez de la Frontera)
- Iglesia de Santiago (Sama)
- Iglesia de Santiago, Sigüenza
