= San Francisco Museum of Modern Art =

Museum in San Francisco, California

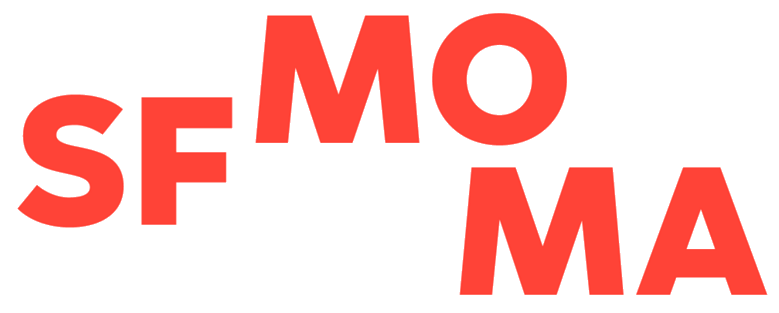

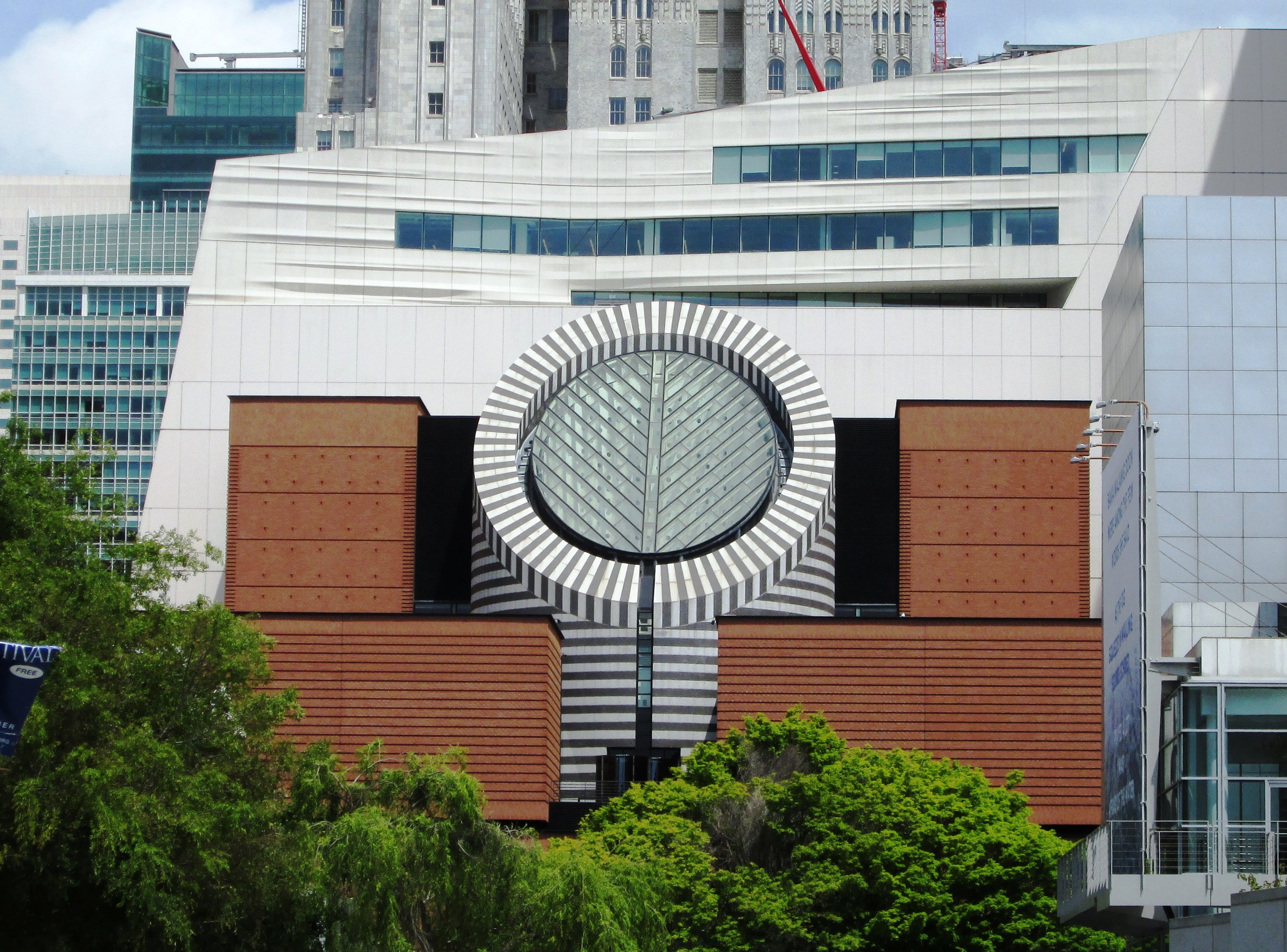
- The 1995 Mario Botta-designed building with the 2016 Snøhetta-designed addition behind it
- Interactive fullscreen map
- Established: 1935
- Location: 151 Third Street, San Francisco, California, US
- Coordinates: 37°47′09″N 122°24′04″W
- Collection size: 33,000
- Visitors: 1,113,984 (2017)
- Director: Christopher Bedford
- President: Diana Nelson
- Chairperson: Robert J. Fisher
- Architects: Mario Botta, 1995; Snøhetta, 2016
- Public transit access: Montgomery Street
- Website: www.sfmoma.org

The San Francisco Museum of Modern Art (SFMOMA) is a modern and contemporary art museum and nonprofit organization located in San Francisco, California. SFMOMA was the first museum on the West Coast devoted solely to 20th-century art, and has built an internationally recognized collection with over 33,000 works of painting, sculpture, photography, architecture, design, and media arts. The collection is displayed in 170,000 square feet (16,000 m^{2}) of exhibition space, making the museum one of the largest in the United States overall, and one of the largest in the world for modern and contemporary art. In 2024, SFMOMA was ranked 14th in The Washington Post's list of the best art museums in the U.S.

The museum was founded in 1935 with galleries in the Veterans Building in Civic Center. In 1995, the museum opened in its Mario Botta-designed home in the SoMa district. On May 14, 2016, following a three-year-long closure for a major expansion project by Snøhetta architects, the museum re-opened to the public with more than double the gallery space and almost six times as much public space as the previous building, allowing SFMOMA to showcase an expanding collection along with the Doris and Donald Fisher Collection of contemporary art.

== History ==
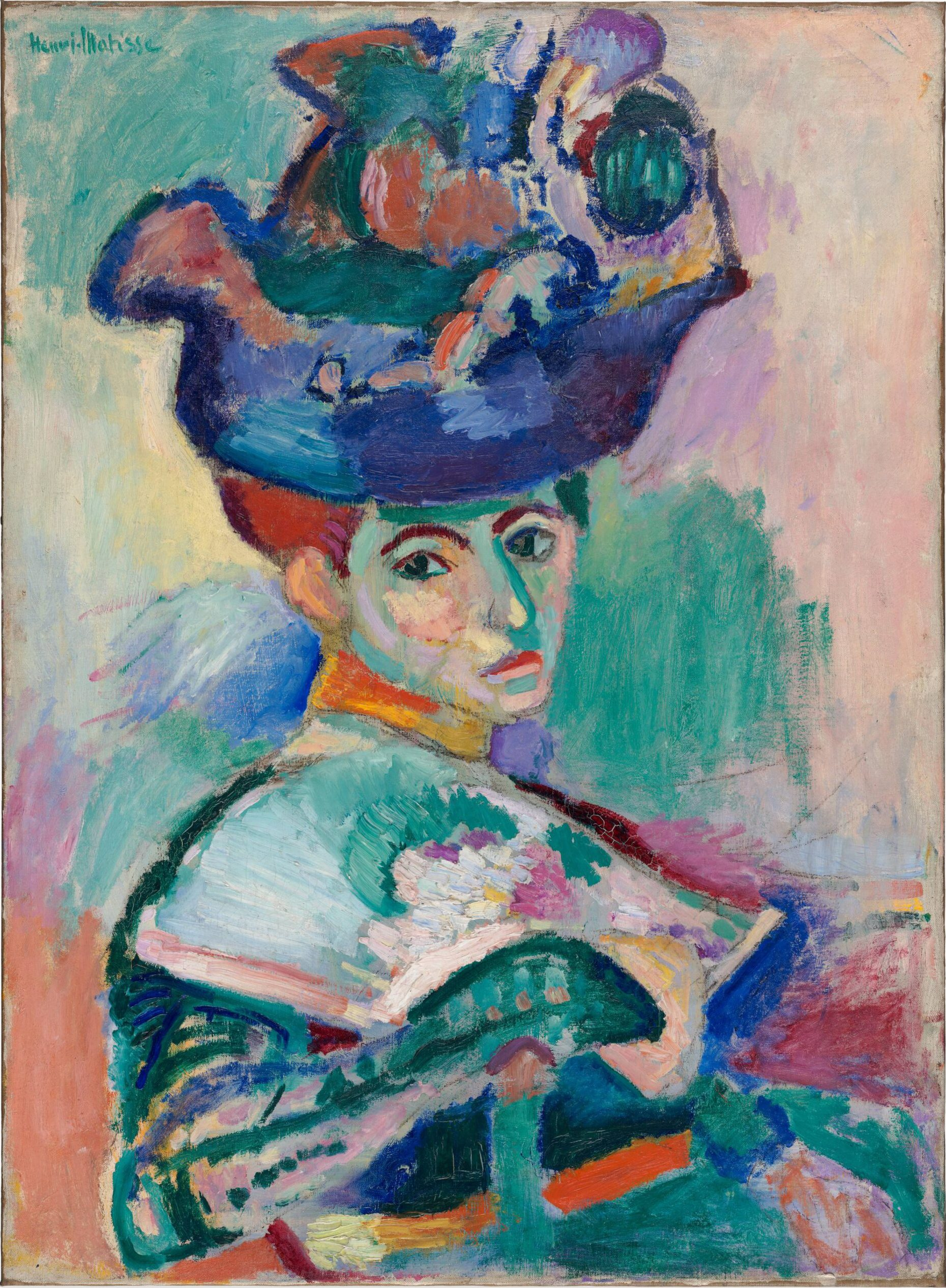
Henri Matisse. Femme au Chapeau (Woman with a Hat), 1905.

SFMOMA was founded in 1935 under director Grace L. McCann Morley as the San Francisco Museum of Art. For its first sixty years, the museum rented the fourth floor of the Veterans Building on Van Ness Avenue in the Civic Center. A gift of 36 artworks from Albert M. Bender, including The Flower Carrier (1935) by Diego Rivera, established the basis of the permanent collection. Bender donated more than 1,100 objects to SFMOMA during his lifetime and endowed the museum's first purchase fund.

The museum began its second year with an exhibition of works by Henri Matisse. Also in 1936, the museum established its photography collection, becoming one of the first museums to recognize photography as an art form. In 1940, the museum held its first architecture exhibition, Telesis: Space for Living.

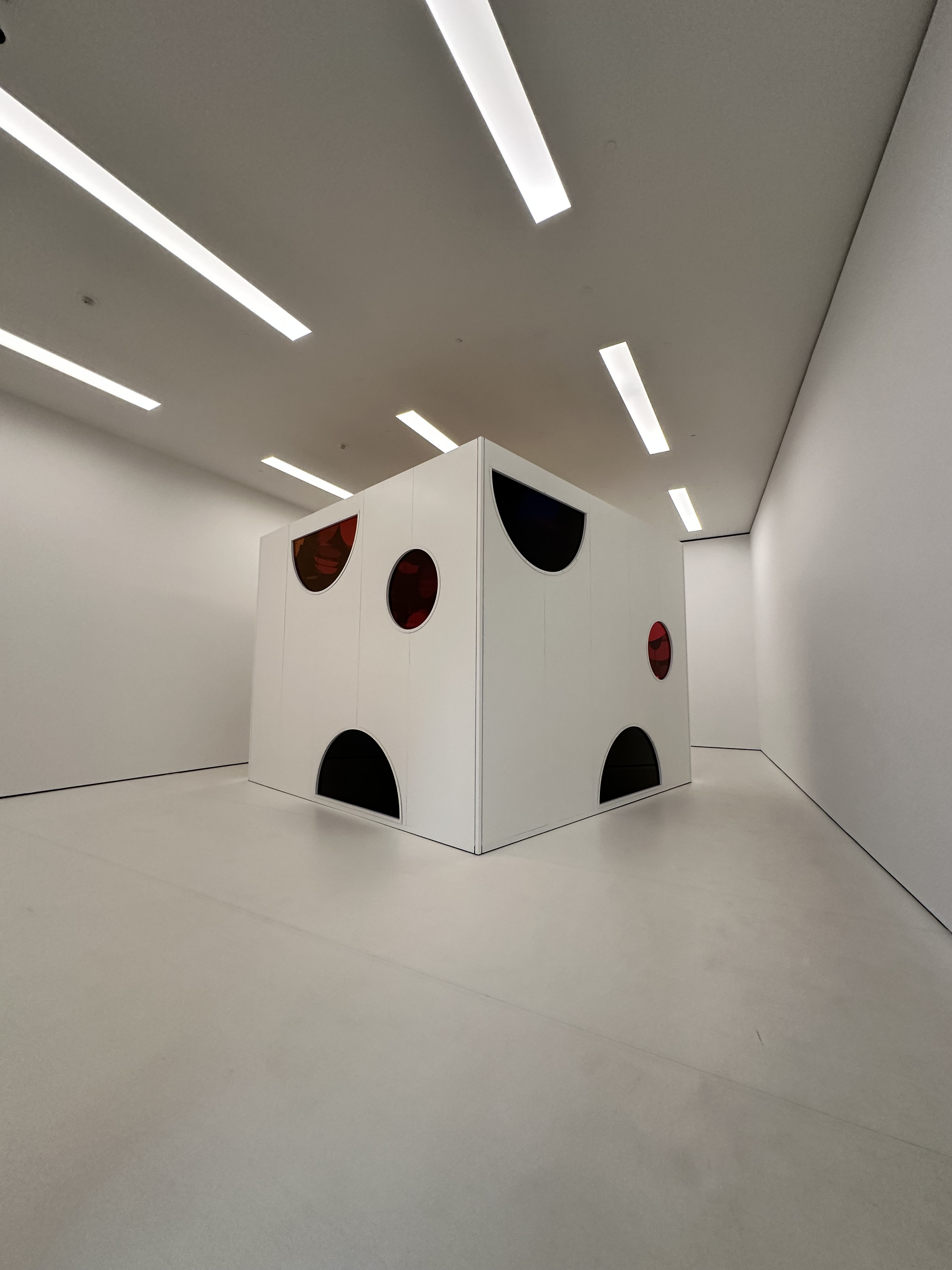
Yayoi Kusama, Dreaming of Earth's Sphericity, I Would Offer My Love installation at SFMOMA, 2024–2025.

The museum was obliged to move to a temporary facility on Post Street in March 1945 to make way for the United Nations Conference on International Organization; following the signing of the United Nations Charter at Herbst Theatre in the Veterans Building, the museum returned to its original location in July. Later that year, the museum presented Jackson Pollock's first solo museum exhibition.

Founding director Grace Morley held film screenings at the museum beginning in 1937, and in 1946 brought in filmmaker Frank Stauffacher to found the Art in Cinema film series, which ran for nine years. The museum continued its expansion into new media with the 1951 launch of a biweekly television program, Art in Your Life, later renamed Discovery, which ran for three years.

Morley ended her 23-year tenure as museum director in 1958 and was succeeded by George D. Culler (1958–65) and Gerald Nordland (1966–72). In 1967, SFMOMA inaugurated the biennial SECA Art Award to honor San Francisco Bay Area artists. The museum rose to international prominence under director Henry T. Hopkins (1974–86), adding "Modern" to its name in 1975.

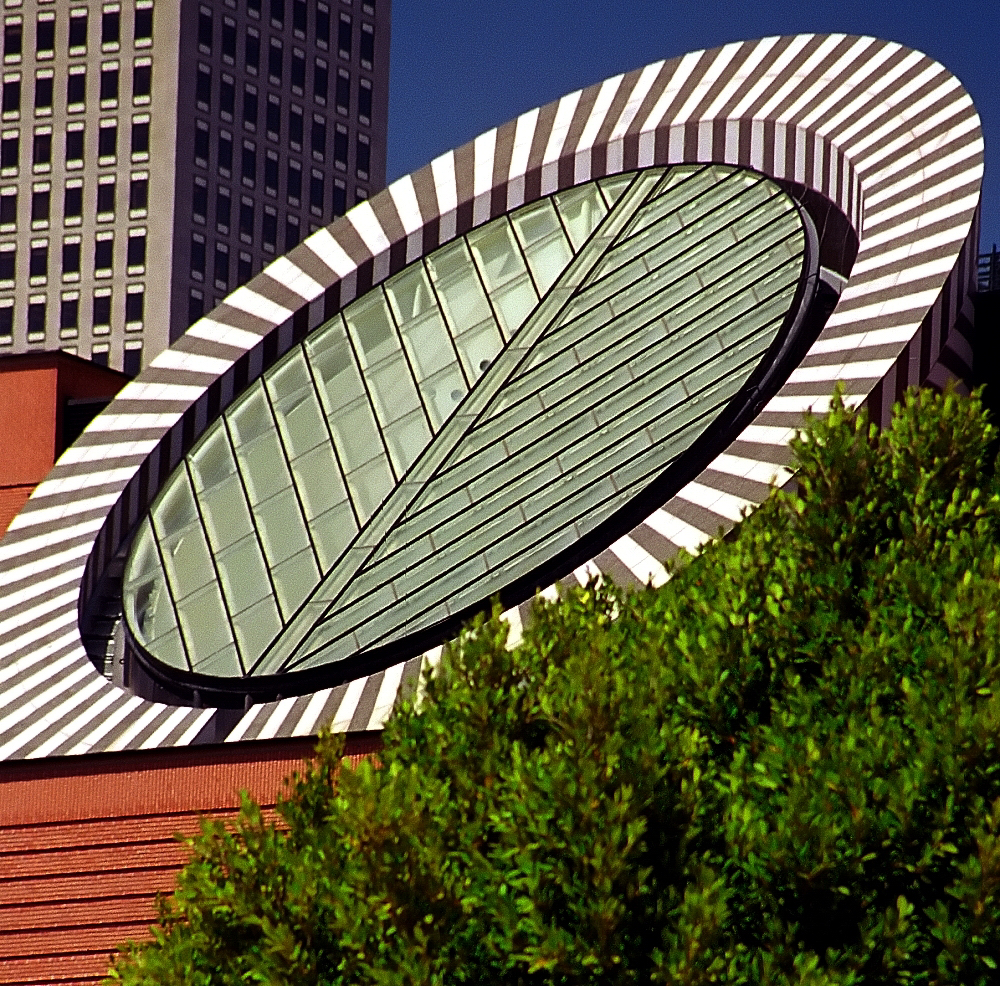
Mario Botta's "giant black-and-white striped silo...sliced on the bias, topped by a 130-foot-high elliptical skylight," at once became "the museum's trademark."

In the 1980s, under Hopkins and his successor John R. Lane (1987–1997), SFMOMA established three new curatorial posts: curator of painting and sculpture, curator of architecture and design, and curator of media arts. The positions of director of education and director of photography were elevated to full curatorial roles. At this time SFMOMA took on an active special exhibitions program, both organizing and hosting traveling exhibitions, including major presentations of the work of Jeff Koons, Sigmar Polke, and Willem de Kooning.

In 1992, Harry W. "Hunk" Anderson and Mary Margaret "Moo" Anderson "transformed SFMOMA's collection of American Pop art in one fell swoop," building on prior gifts of works by Robert Rauschenberg and Jasper Johns with additional works dating from the early 1960s to the early 1980s, including paintings by Jim Dine, Roy Lichtenstein, James Rosenquist, Andy Warhol, and Robert Indiana, as well as a wall relief by Claes Oldenburg.

In January 1995 the museum opened its current location at 151 Third Street, adjacent to Yerba Buena Gardens in the SOMA district. Mario Botta, a Swiss architect from Canton Ticino, designed the new US$60 million facility.

SFMOMA made a number of important acquisitions under the direction of David A. Ross (1998–2001), who had been recruited from the Whitney Museum in New York, including works by Ellsworth Kelly, Robert Rauschenberg, René Magritte, and Piet Mondrian, as well as Marcel Duchamp's iconic Fountain (1917/1964). Those and acquisitions of works by Jasper Johns, Mark Rothko, Francis Bacon, Alexander Calder, Chuck Close and Frank Stella put the institution in the top ranks of American museums of modern art. After three years and $140 million building up the collection, Ross resigned when a slow economy forced the museum to keep a tighter rein on its resources.

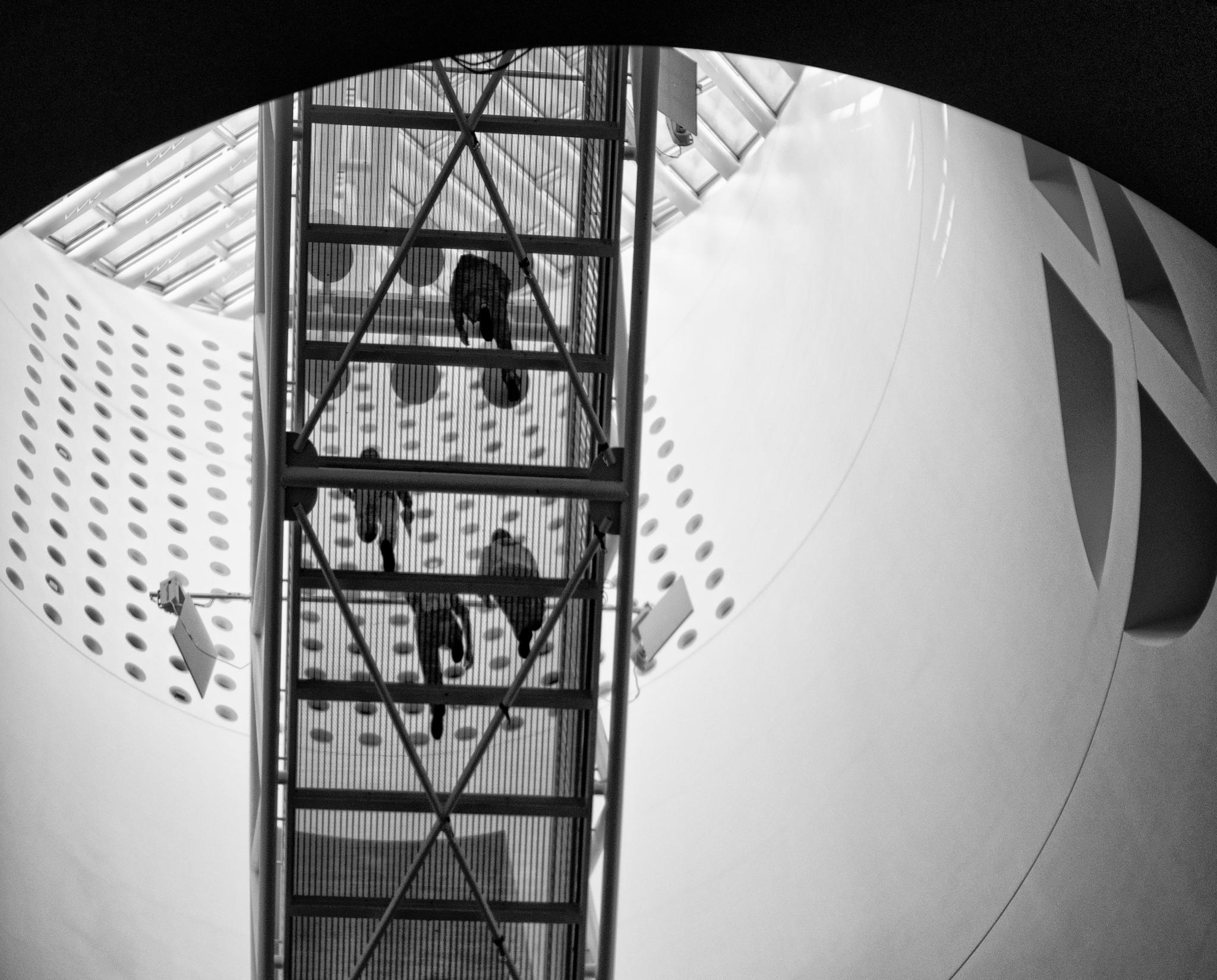
Visitors traverse the Oculus Bridge, situated below the giant skylight and five floors above the entrance level.

The 2003 exhibition Treasures Of Modern Art: The Legacy Of Phyllis Wattis featured more than 80 of the many works donated by art patron Phyllis Wattis, who died in 2002, including works by Robert Rauschenberg, Piet Mondrian, René Magritte, Marcel Duchamp, Andy Warhol, and Barnett Newman.

Under director Neal Benezra, who was recruited from the Art Institute of Chicago in 2002, SFMOMA achieved an increase in both visitor numbers and membership while continuing to build its collection. In 2005 the museum announced the promised gift of nearly 800 photographs to the Prentice and Paul Sack Photographic Trust at SFMOMA from the Sacks' private collection. The museum saw record attendance in 2008 with the exhibition Frida Kahlo, which drew more than 400,000 visitors during its three-month run.

In 2009, the museum gained a custodial relationship for the contemporary art collection of Doris and Donald Fisher of Gap Inc. The Fisher Collection includes some 1,100 works from artists including Alexander Calder, Chuck Close, Willem de Kooning, Richard Diebenkorn, Anselm Kiefer, Ellsworth Kelly, Roy Lichtenstein, Brice Marden, Agnes Martin, Gerhard Richter, Richard Serra, Cy Twombly, and Andy Warhol, among many others. The collection will be on loan to SFMOMA for a period of 100 years.

In 2009, SFMOMA announced plans for a major expansion to accommodate its growing audiences, programs, and collections and to showcase the Doris and Donald Fisher collection of contemporary art. In 2010—the museum's 75th anniversary year—architecture firm Snøhetta was selected to design a major addition. SFMOMA closed to the public and broke ground for its expansion in May 2013, re-opening three years later. During the closure, SFMOMA presented exhibitions and programs at off-site locations around the Bay Area as part of SFMOMA On the Go.

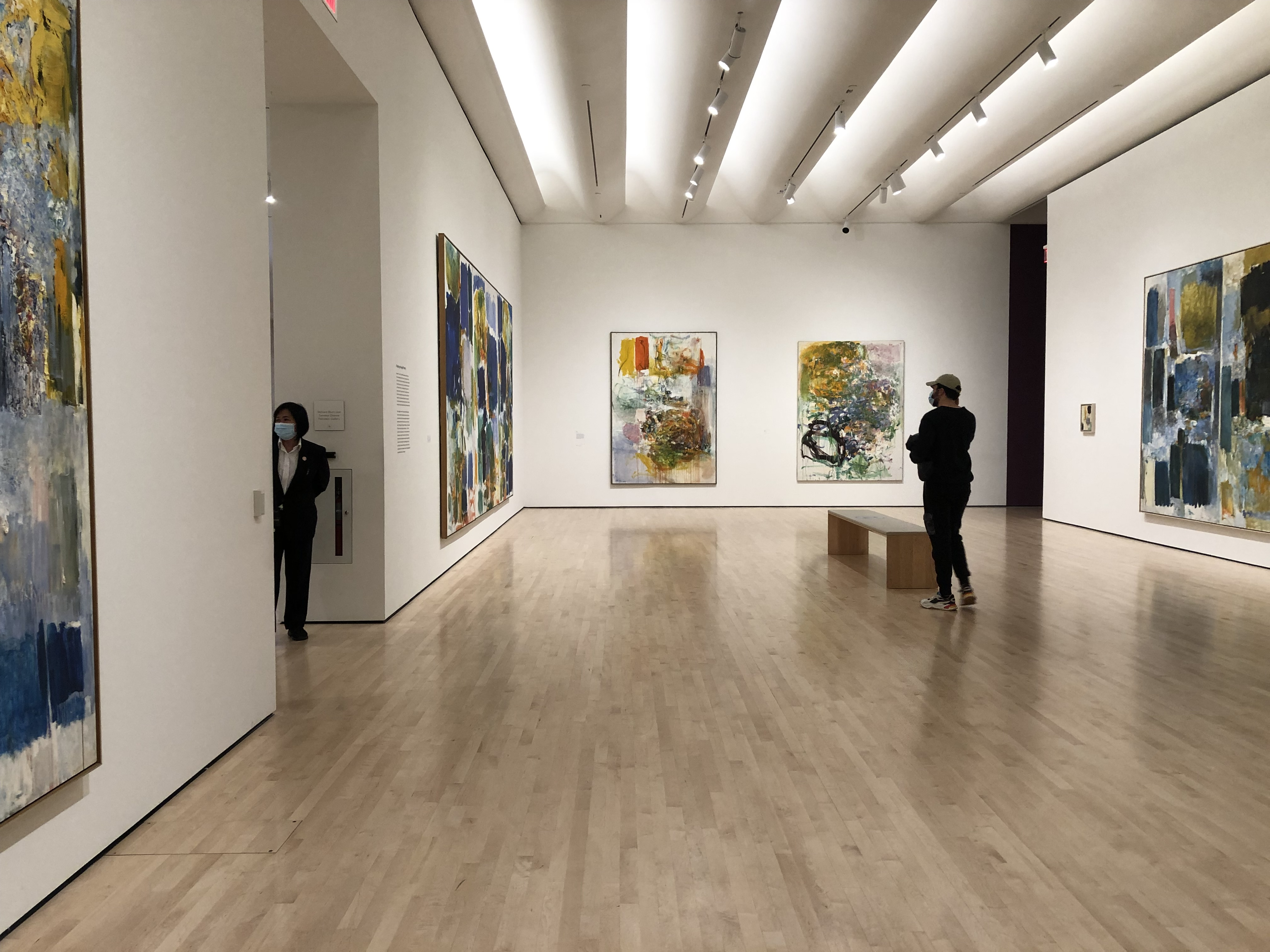
Museum guard and visitor at the Joan Mitchell retrospective in 2021.

In February 2011, the museum launched a Collections Campaign, announcing the acquisition of 195 works including paintings from Jackson Pollock, Willem de Kooning, Jasper Johns, Robert Rauschenberg and Francis Bacon. Also under the auspices of the Collections Campaign, promised gifts of 473 photographs were announced in 2012, including 26 works by Diane Arbus and significant gifts of Japanese photography.

In July 2020, the senior curator of painting and sculpture, Gary Garrels, resigned after using the term "reverse discrimination" during an all-staff Zoom meeting, which caused an uproar. Looking back on the incident in 2023, and quoting Garrel's resignation letter in full, the International Committee for Museums and Collections of Modern Art (CiMAM) called his resignation "a radical and bewildering gesture by an advocate for diversity."

In 2022, Christopher Bedford was named director, succeeding Neal Benezra.

== Architecture ==
=== Mario Botta building, 1995 ===
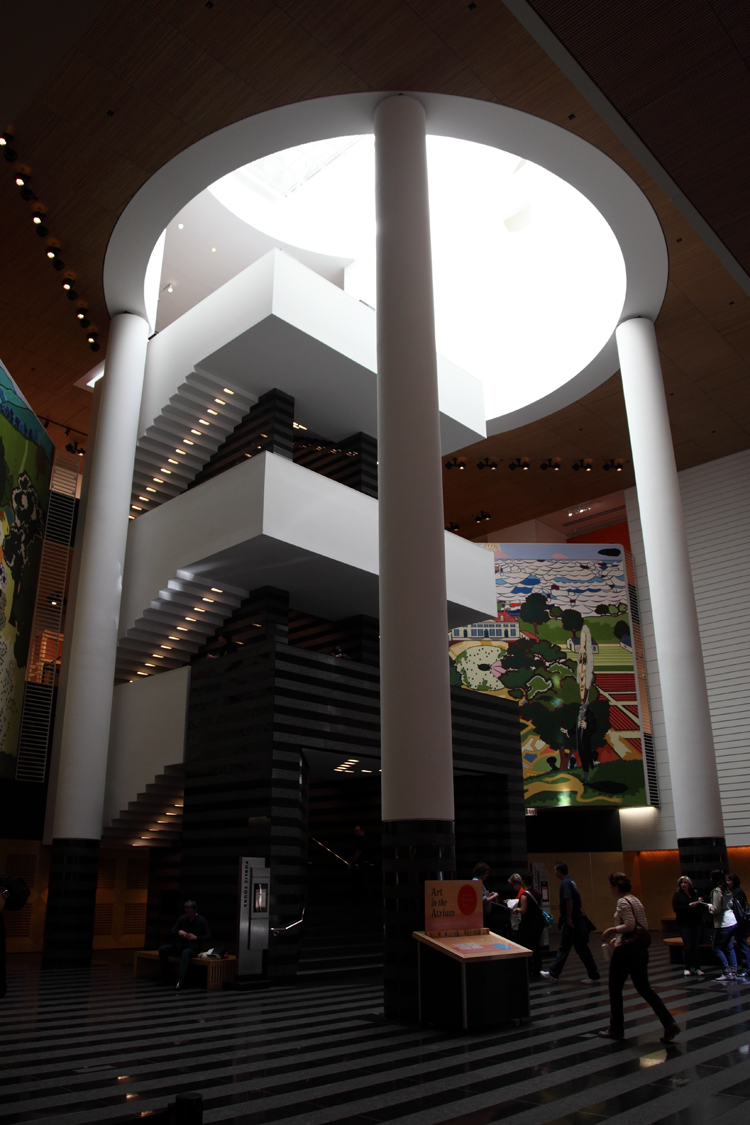
The atrium as designed by Botta, before removal of the staircase for the 2016 renovation.

In the summer of 1988, architects Mario Botta, Thomas Beeby and Frank Gehry were announced as finalists in a competition to design the San Francisco Museum of Modern Art's new structure in Downtown. Semifinalists included Charles Moore and Tadao Ando. The three finalists were to present site-specific design proposals later that year, but the museum canceled its architectural competition after only a month and went with the 45-year-old Botta.

The new museum, planned in association with architects Hellmuth, Obata and Kassabaum, was built on a 59,000-square-foot (5,500 m^{2}) parking lot on Third Street between Mission and Howard streets. The South-of-Market site, near Moscone Convention Center, was targeted through an agreement between the museum, the redevelopment agency, and the development firm of Olympia & York. Land was provided by the agency and developer, but the rest of the museum was privately funded. Construction of the five-story building began in early 1992, with an opening in 1995, the institution's 60th anniversary.

At the time of the new building's opening, SFMOMA touted itself as the largest new American art museum of the decade and, with its 50,000 square feet (4,600 m^{2}) of exhibition space, the second-largest single structure in the United States devoted to modern art. (New York's Museum of Modern Art, with 100,000 square feet (9,300 m^{2}) of gallery space, was then the largest single structure, while the nearly 80,000 combined square feet of Museum of Contemporary Art, Los Angeles put it in second place).

Michael Kimmelman in The New York Times reported that the new Botta building

consists of galleries rising around a central, skylighted atrium. The overall structure, roughly speaking, is a series of stepped-back blocks with a cylinder in the middle containing the soaring light well and stairway...Outside, rising above the nearly windowless, striated brick facade, is the giant black-and-white striped silo of the central well, sliced on the bias, topped by a 130-foot-high elliptical skylight that has already become the museum's trademark.

Botta's interior design is marked by alternating bands of polished and flame-finished black granite on the floor, ground-level walls, and column bases, and by bands of natural and black-stained wood on the reception desks and coat-check desk.

=== Rooftop sculpture garden and pavilion, 2009 ===
In 2009, SFMOMA opened its 14,400 sq ft (1,340 m^{2}) rooftop sculpture garden and pavilion, located above the museum's parking structure and situated across an enclosed pedestrian bridge from the fifth-floor galleries. Following an invitational competition held in 2006, the garden was designed by Jensen Architects in collaboration with Conger Moss Guillard Landscape Architecture. It features two open-air spaces for plants and sculpture and between them a glass pavilion for dining. The larger sculpture garden affords views of the city skyline, dominated by the imposing art deco facade of the 140 New Montgomery skyscraper.

=== Snøhetta expansion, 2016 ===
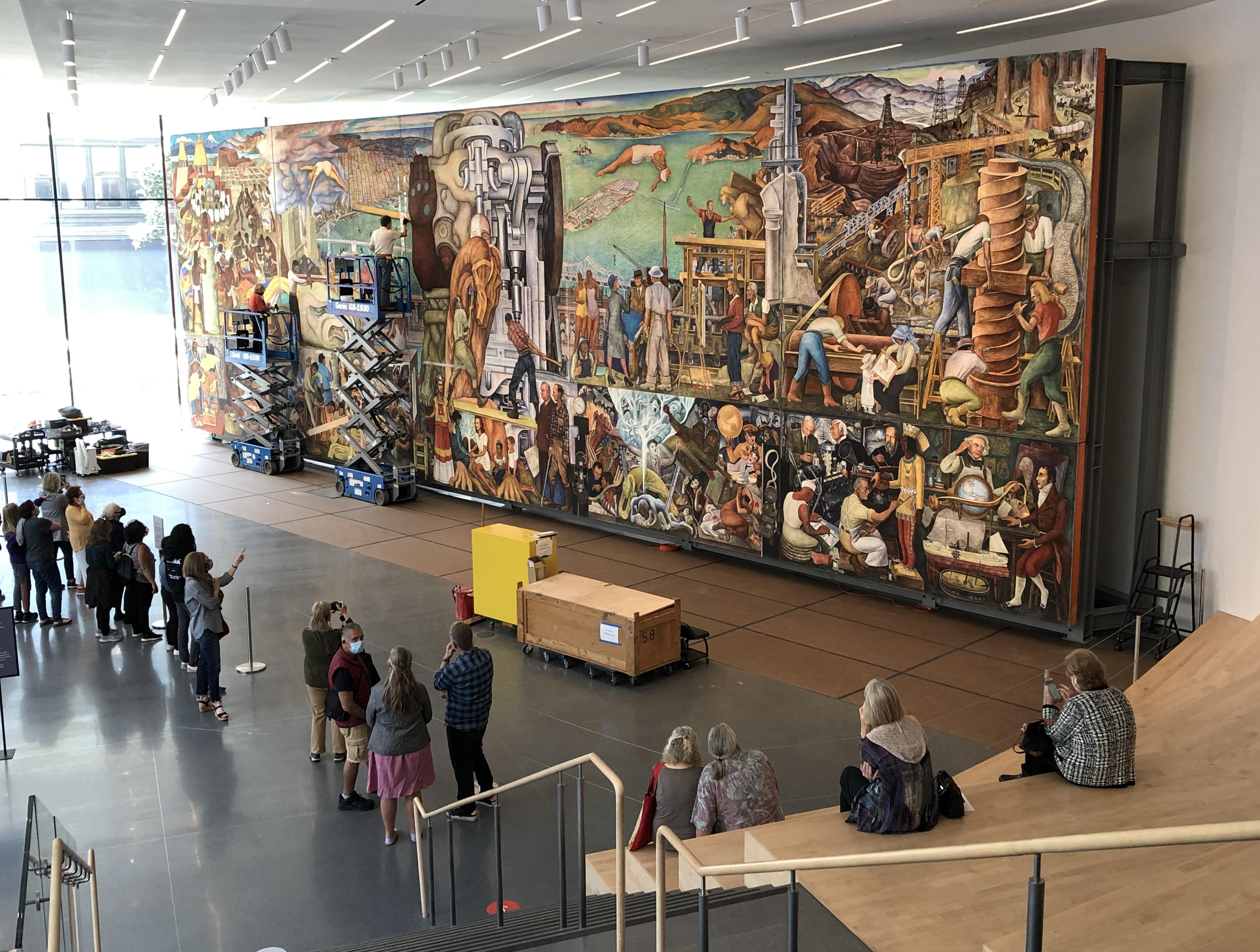
Diego Rivera's Pan American Unity mural (1940) under restoration in the Roberts Family Gallery at SFMOMA, July 19, 2021.

In 2009, in response to significant growth in the museum's audiences and collections since the opening of the 1995 building, SFMOMA announced plans to expand. A shortlist released in May 2010 included four architecture firms officially under consideration for the project: Adjaye Associates; Diller Scofidio + Renfro; Foster + Partners; and Norwegian architecture firm Snøhetta. In July 2010 the museum selected Snøhetta to design the expansion.

On May 14, 2016, following a three-year-long closure, the museum re-opened to the public. The approximately 235,000-square-foot (21,800 m^{2}) expansion joined the existing building with a new addition spanning from Minna to Howard Streets. The expanded building includes seven levels dedicated to art and public programming, and three floors housing enhanced support space for the museum's operations. It offers approximately 142,000 square feet (13,200 m^{2}) of indoor and outdoor gallery space, as well as nearly 15,000 square feet (1,400 m^{2}) of art-filled free-access public space, more than doubling SFMOMA's previous capacity for the presentation of art and providing almost six times as much public space as the pre-expansion building. The soaring "silo" with its Oculus Bridge remained, but the Botta staircase was removed.

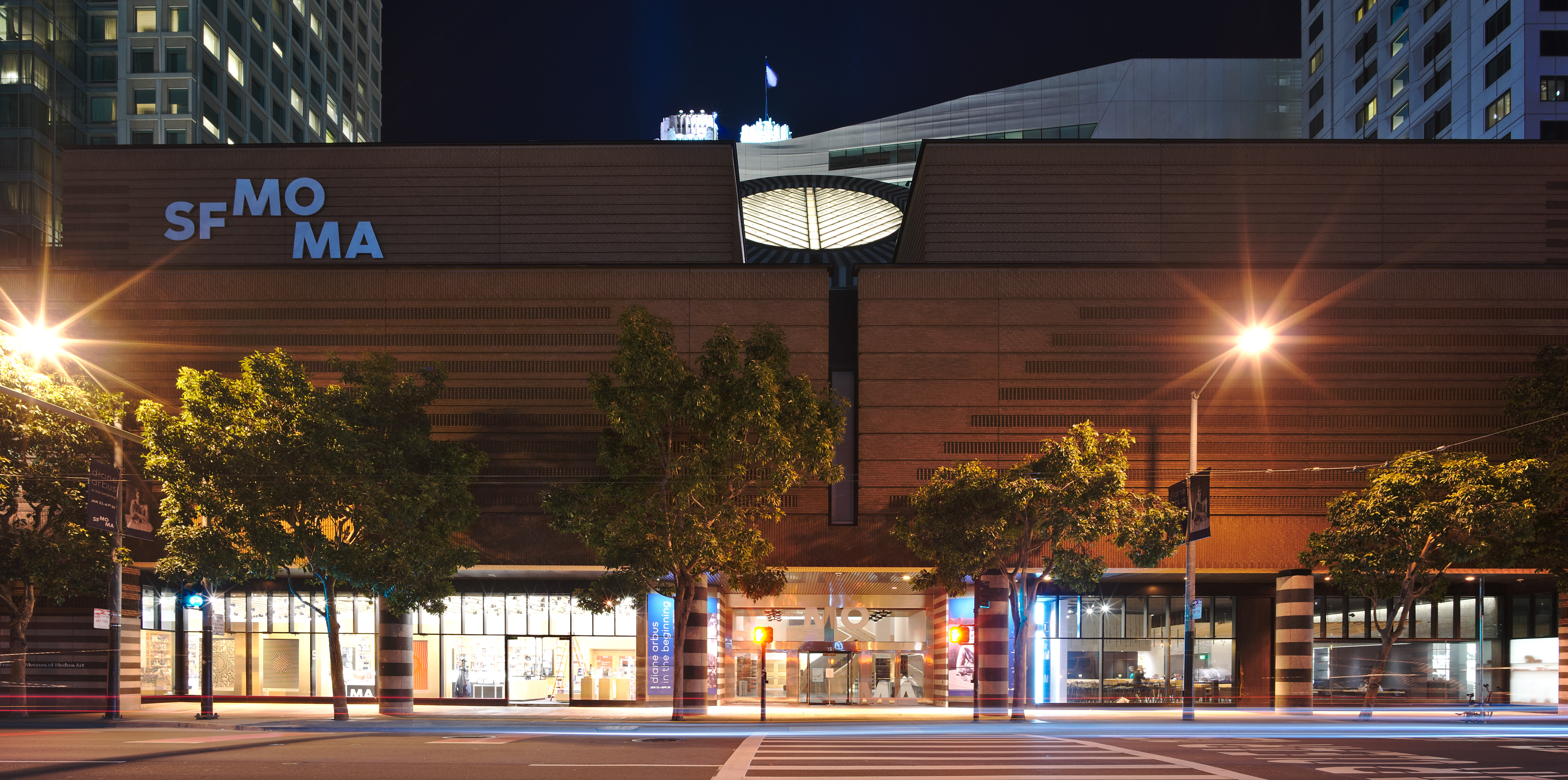
SFMOMA by night. As of 2026 the museum is open until 8 p.m. on Thursdays.

The expanded building includes a large-scale vertical garden on the third floor, purported to be the biggest public living wall of native plants in San Francisco; the large, free-access Roberts Family Gallery on the ground-floor gallery facing Howard Street, with 25-foot (7.6 m) glass walls that place art on view to passersby; a double-height "white box" space on the fourth floor with sophisticated lighting and sound systems; state-of-the-art conservation studios on the seventh and eighth floors; and, on the seventh floor, a long balcony that offers skyline views to the east, toward Salesforce Tower and the Bay Bridge. The expansion facades are clad with lightweight panels made of Fibre-Reinforced Plastic; upon completion, this was the largest application of composites technology to architecture in the United States at the time. The building achieved LEED Gold certification, with 15% energy-cost reduction, 30% water-use reduction, and 20% reduction in wastewater generation.

== Board of Trustees and Directors ==
The SFMOMA Board of Trustees is chaired by Robert J. Fisher; its president is Diana Nelson. Artist Trustees are Tucker Nichols and Carrie Mae Weems. Past Artist Trustees, who normally serve for three years, include (beginning in 2006) Robert Bechtle Larry Sultan, Yves Béhar, Ed Ruscha, Rosana Castrillo Díaz, Jeff Wall, David Huffman, and Julie Mehretu.

The SFMOMA web site maintains a current list of all trustees.

The Director of SFMOMA is Christopher Bedford, who was appointed in 2022. Previous Directors include Grace Morley (1935–1958), George D. Culler (1958–1965), Gerald Nordland (1966–1972), Henry T. Hopkins (1974–1986), John R. Lane (1987–1997), David A. Ross (1998–2001), and Neal Benezra (2002–2022).

== Collections, programs, and publications ==
Jackson Pollock had his first museum show at SFMOMA, as did Clyfford Still and Arshile Gorky.

The museum has in its collection important works by Ansel Adams, Joan Brown, Jerome Caja, Alexander Calder, Jay DeFeo, Richard Diebenkorn, Marcel Duchamp, Jess, Frida Kahlo, Anselm Kiefer, Ellsworth Kelly, Paul Klee, Dorothea Lange, Agnes Martin, Henri Matisse, Richard Mayhew, Jean Metzinger, Joan Mitchell, Chiura Obata, David Park, Jackson Pollock, Gerhard Richter, Diego Rivera, Mark Rothko, Richard Serra, Frank Stella, Clyfford Still, Wayne Thiebaud, Cy Twombly, Andy Warhol, among many others.

Presentation of the collection is overseen by curators for painting and sculpture; photography; architecture and design; and media arts.

SFMOMA's website allows users to browse the museum's permanent collection.

SFMOMA's Research Library was established in 1935 and contains extensive resources pertaining to modern and contemporary art, including books, periodicals, artists' files, photographs and media collections.

The Koret Education Center on the second floor offers resources for educators, and hosts events and talks. Larger events are held in the theater on the first floor

SFMOMA has published numerous books, catalogues, and digital publications to document and provide context for exhibitions and the museum's collection, and to showcase the scholarship of curators. Recent books include Tauba Auerbach ― S v Z (2020), Dawoud Bey: Two American Projects (2020), Joan Mitchell (2021), and Rafael Lozano-Hemmer: Unstable Presence (2021).

=== Selected highlights ===
- Frieda and Diego Rivera by Frida Kahlo, 1931
- The Flower Carrier by Diego Rivera, 1935
- Boston Common by David Park, 1935
- PH-371 (1947-S) by Clyfford Still, 1947
- Guardians of the Secret by Jackson Pollock, 1943
- Collection by Robert Rauschenberg, 1954/1955
- Incision by Jay Defeo, 1958–60
- St. Valentine's Day Massacre/Homage to Errol Flynn by Bruce Conner, 1960
- Polar Stampede by Lee Krasner, 1960
- No. 14 by Mark Rothko, 1960
- Cityscape #1 by Richard Diebenkorn, 1963
- Intermission by Edward Hopper, 1963
- Noel in the Kitchen by Joan Brown, ca. 1964
- Self-Portrait by Andy Warhol, 1967
- Untitled, from the portfolio Troubled Waters by William Eggleston, 1970–73
- My Mother Posing for Me, from the series Pictures from Home by Larry Sultan, 1984
- Sunset Streets by Wayne Thiebaud, 1985
- Michael Jackson and Bubbles by Jeff Koons, 1988
- Bracket by Joan Mitchell, 1989
- Hand Tools by Jerome Caja, ca. 1990
- Narkissos by Jess, 1976–1991
- Spider by Louise Bourgeois, 1995
- Delusions by Richard Mayhew, 2000
- Honey-Pop chair by Tokujin Yoshioka, 2001
- Drawing Restraint 14 by Matthew Barney, 2006

=== Gallery ===
This gallery is restricted to images and objects in the collections of SFMOMA that are free of copyright.

Anna Atkins, Asplenium radicans (Jamaica), ca. 1850

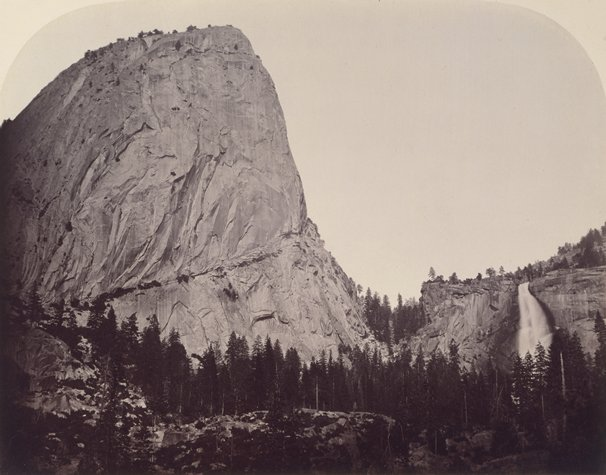
Carleton E. Watkins, Mt. Broderick, Nevada Fall, 700 ft., Yosemite, 1861

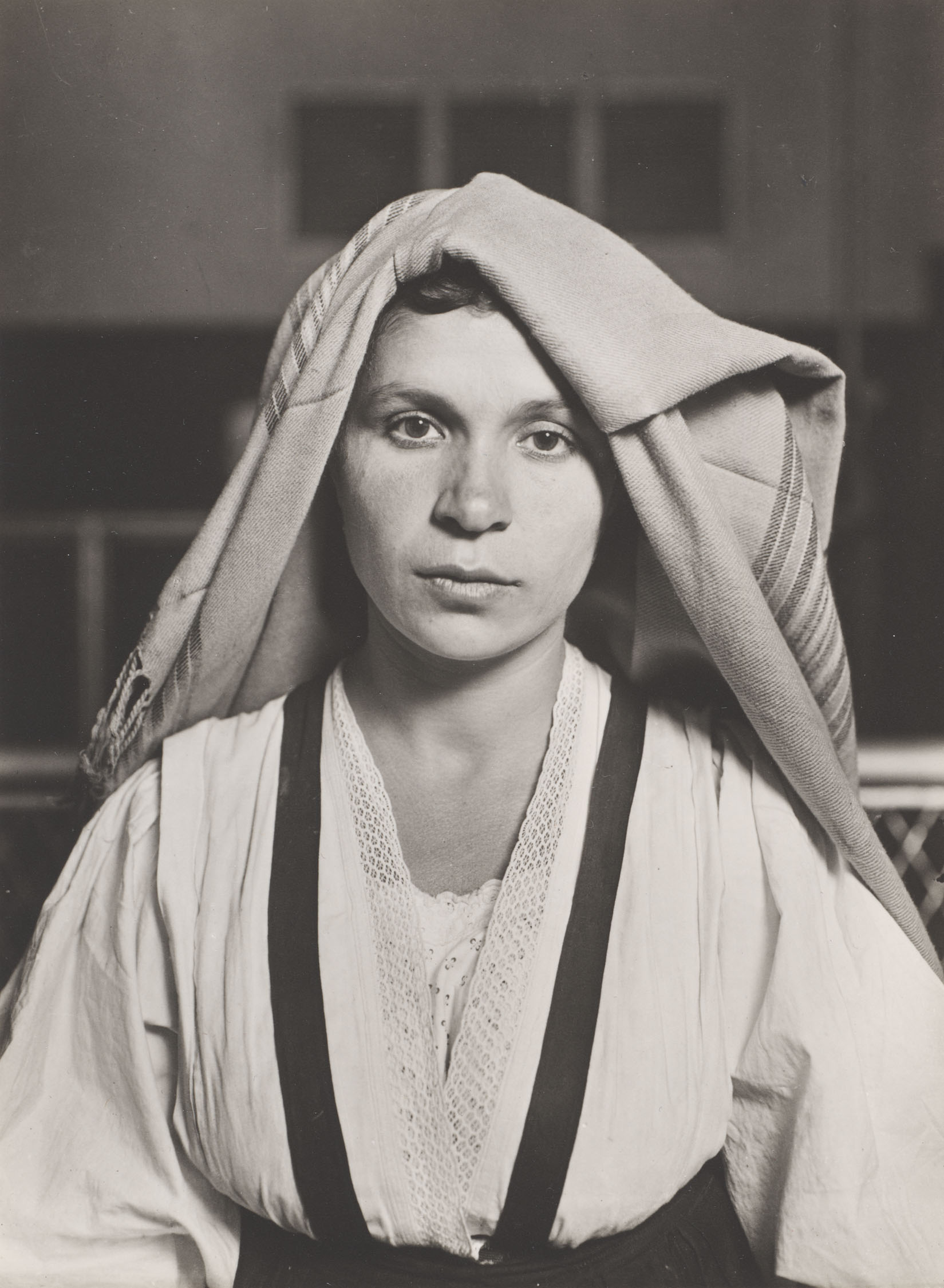
Lewis Wickes Hine, Woman with Folded Headdress, Ellis Island, NY, 1905

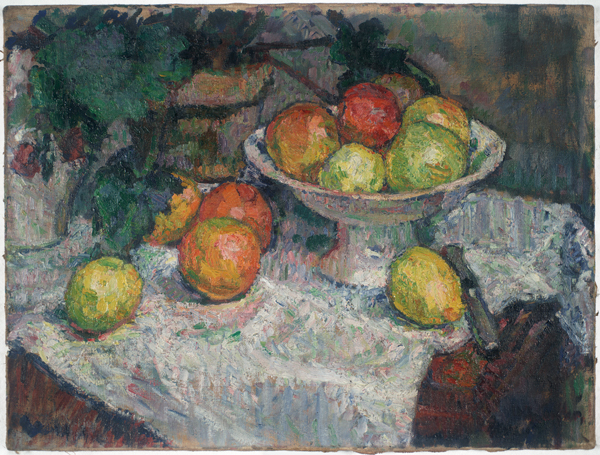
Mathilde Vollmoeller-Purrmann, Stillleben mit Früchten, 1906–07

Georges Braque, Violin and Candlestick, 1910

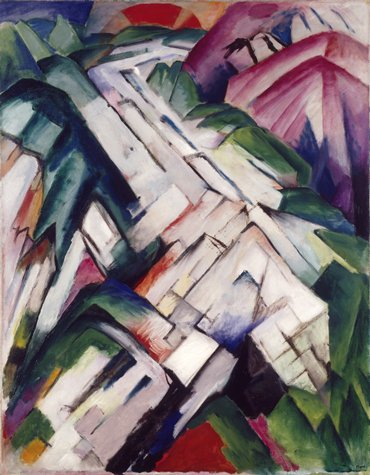
Franz Marc, Gebirge (Mountains), 1911-1912

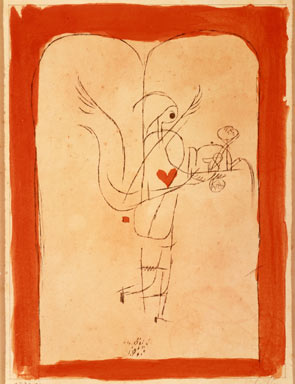
Paul Klee, A Spirit Serves a Small Breakfast, Angel Brings the Desired, 1920

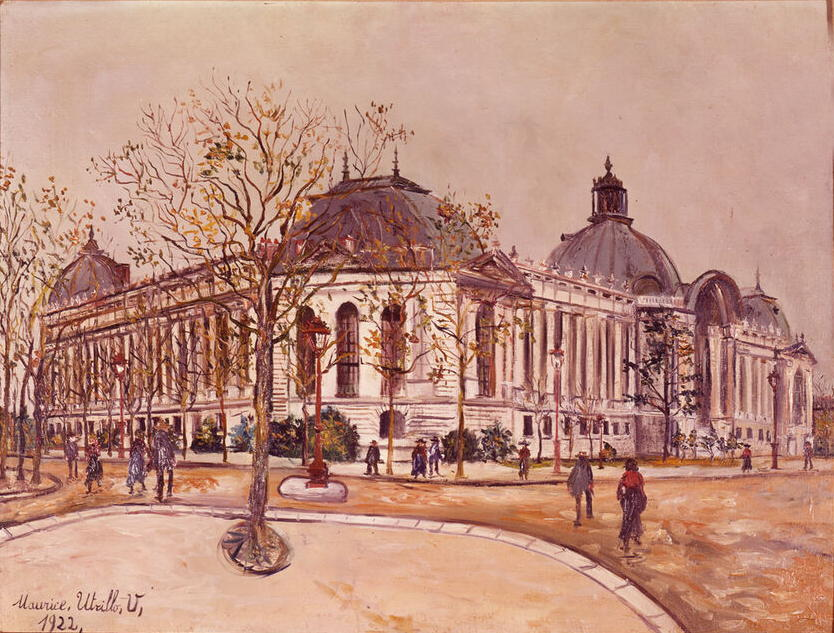
Maurice Utrillo, Le Petit Palais, 1922

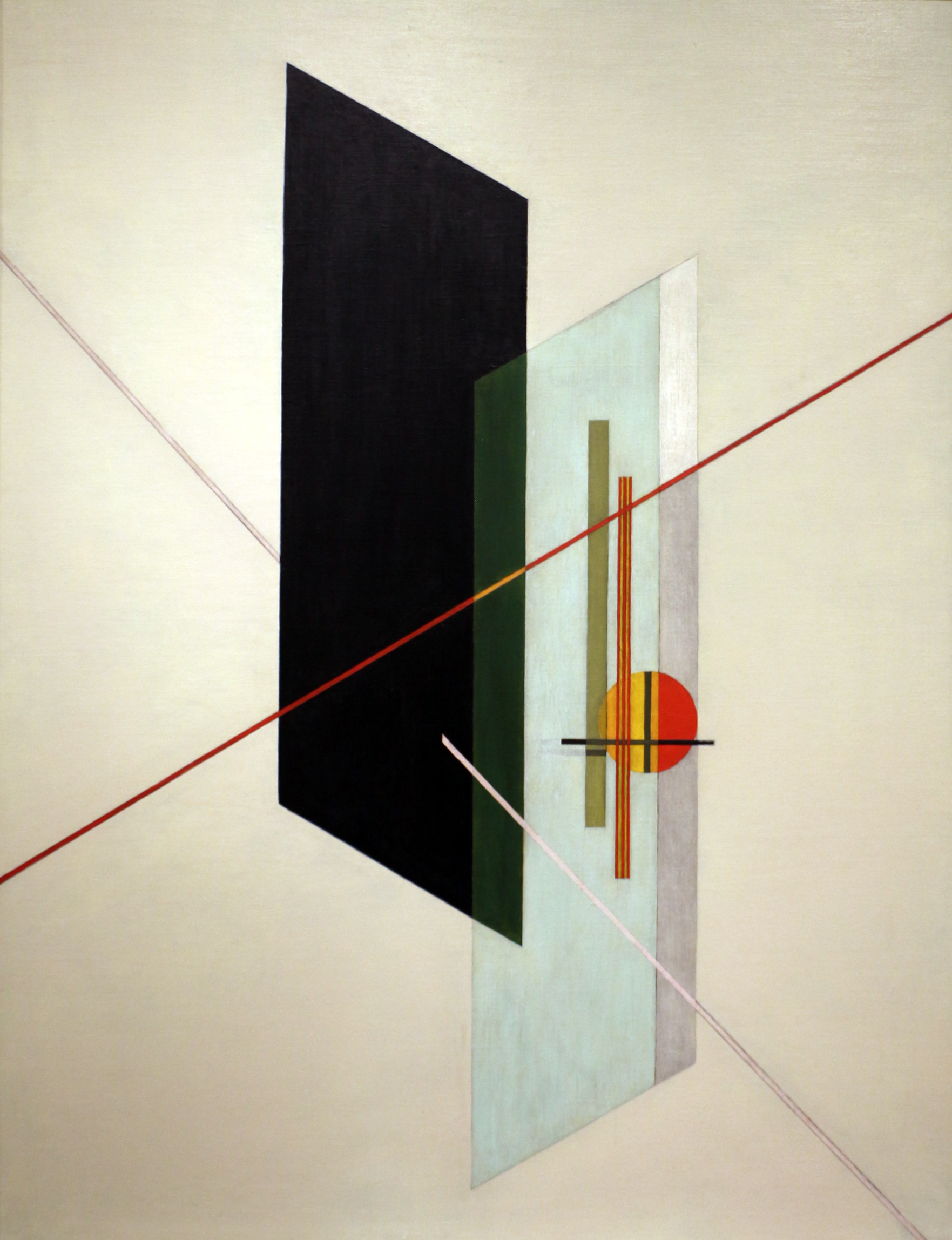
László Moholy-Nagy, A IX, 1923

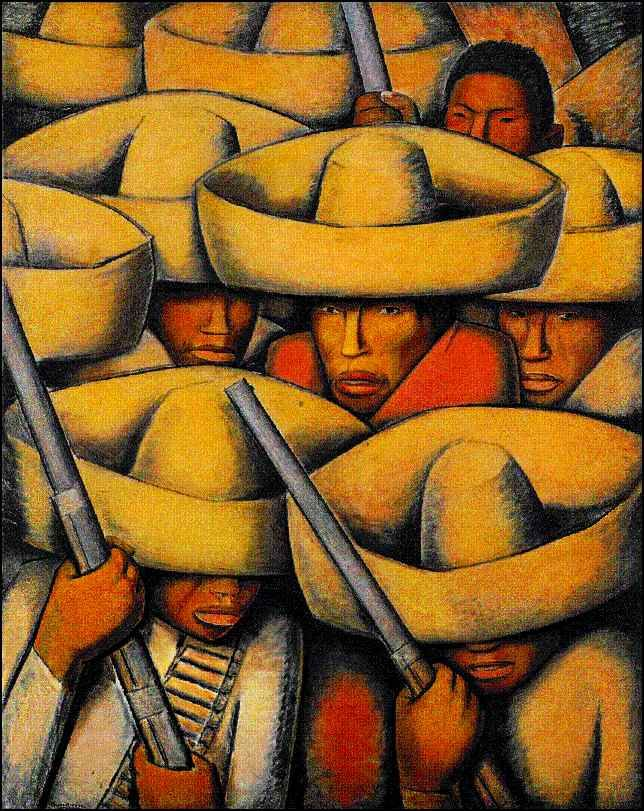
Alfredo Ramos Martínez, Zapatistas, c. 1932

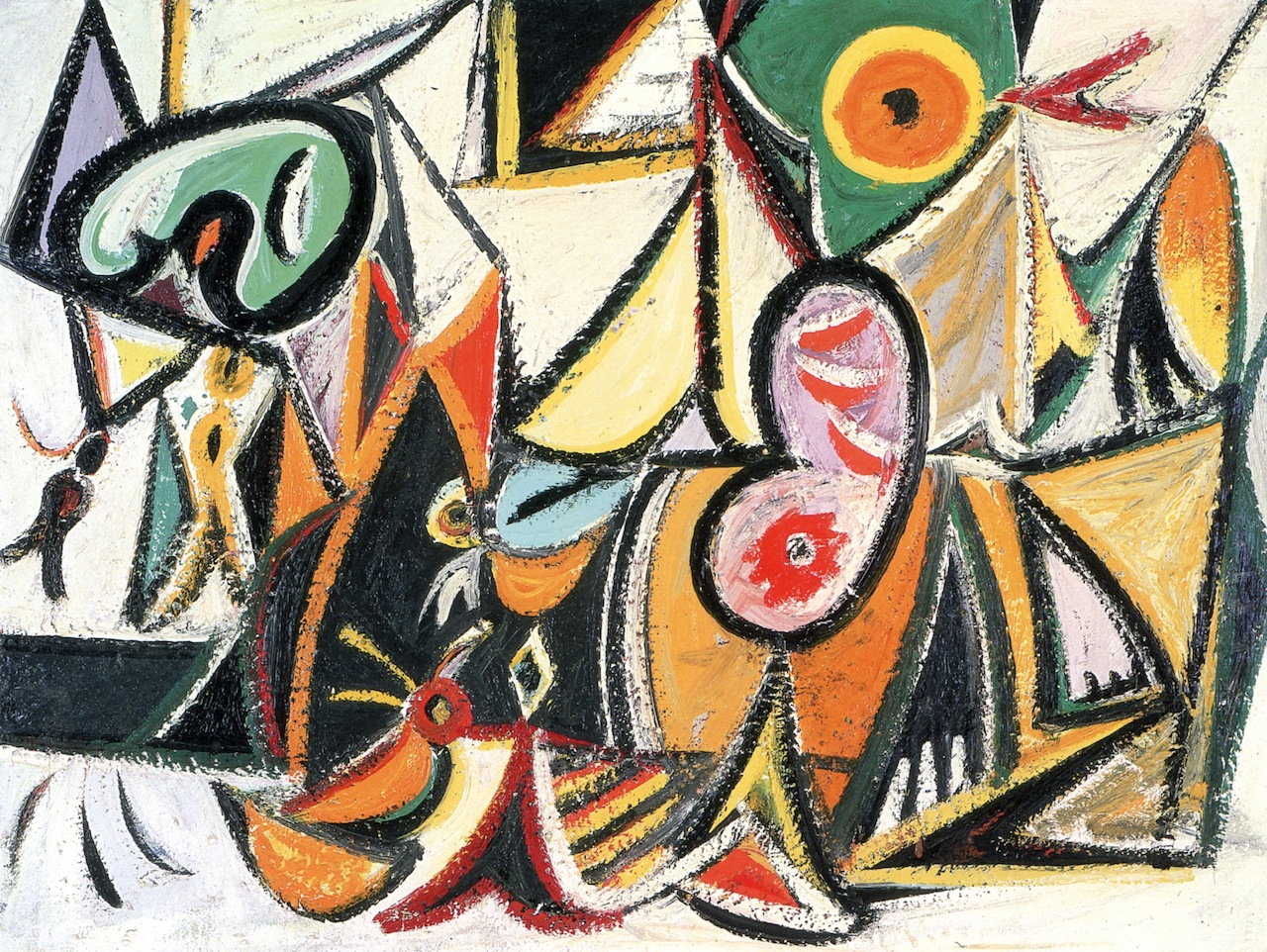
Arshile Gorky, Enigmatic Combat, 1936-1937

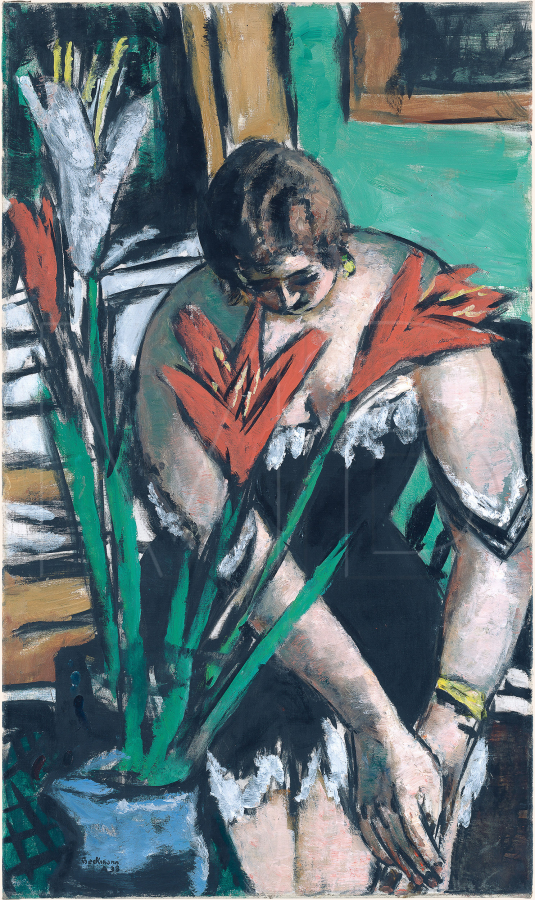
Max Beckmann, Woman at Her Toilet with Red and White Lilies, 1938

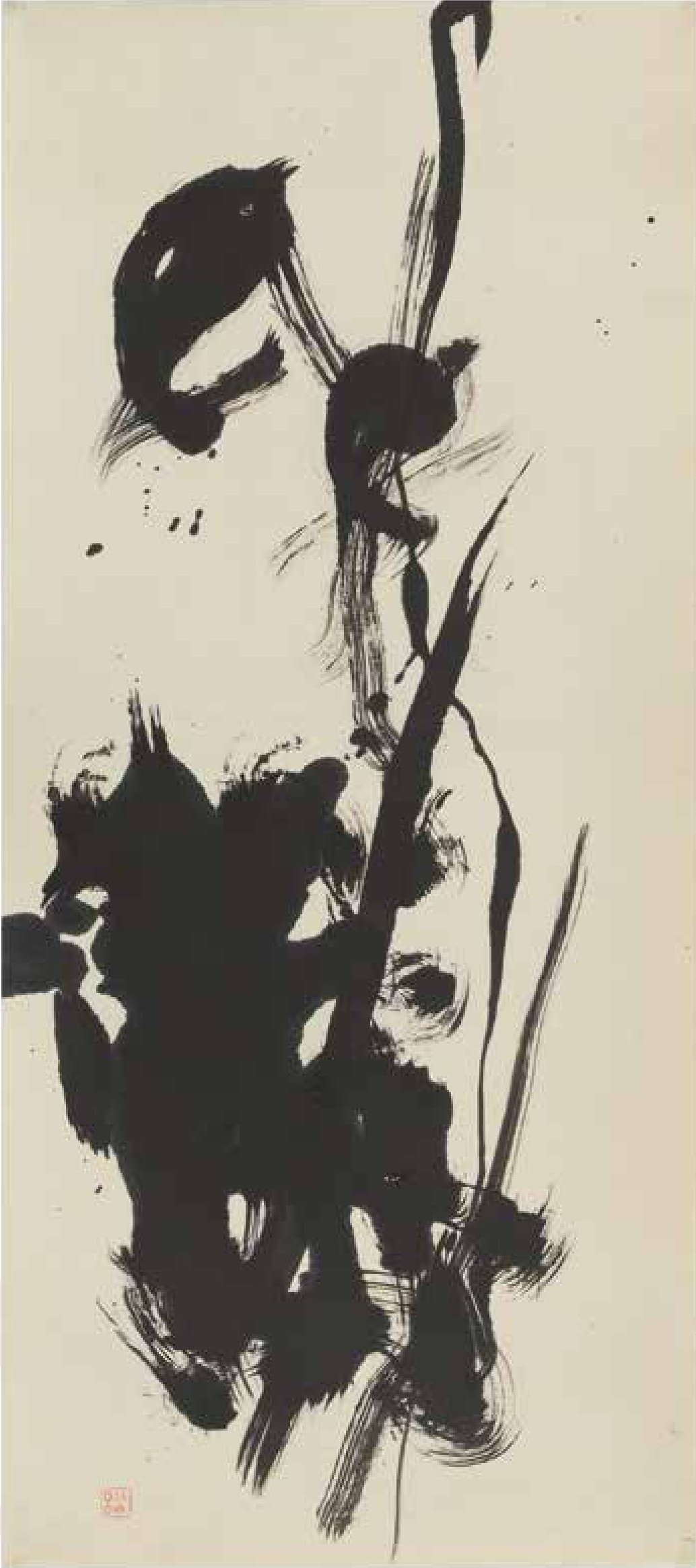
Saburo Hasegawa, Abstract Calligraphy, 1955–57

== See also ==
- America's Favorite Architecture (2007)
- 49-Mile Scenic Drive
- Donald Fisher
- Harry W. Anderson
- List of largest art museums
- List of museums in San Francisco
- San Francisco Art Institute
