= Sama, Asturias =

Coordinates: 43°17′51″N 5°41′04″W

- Parish
- Interactive map of Sama, Asturias
- Country: Spain
- Autonomous community: Asturias
- Province: Asturias
- Municipality: Langreo

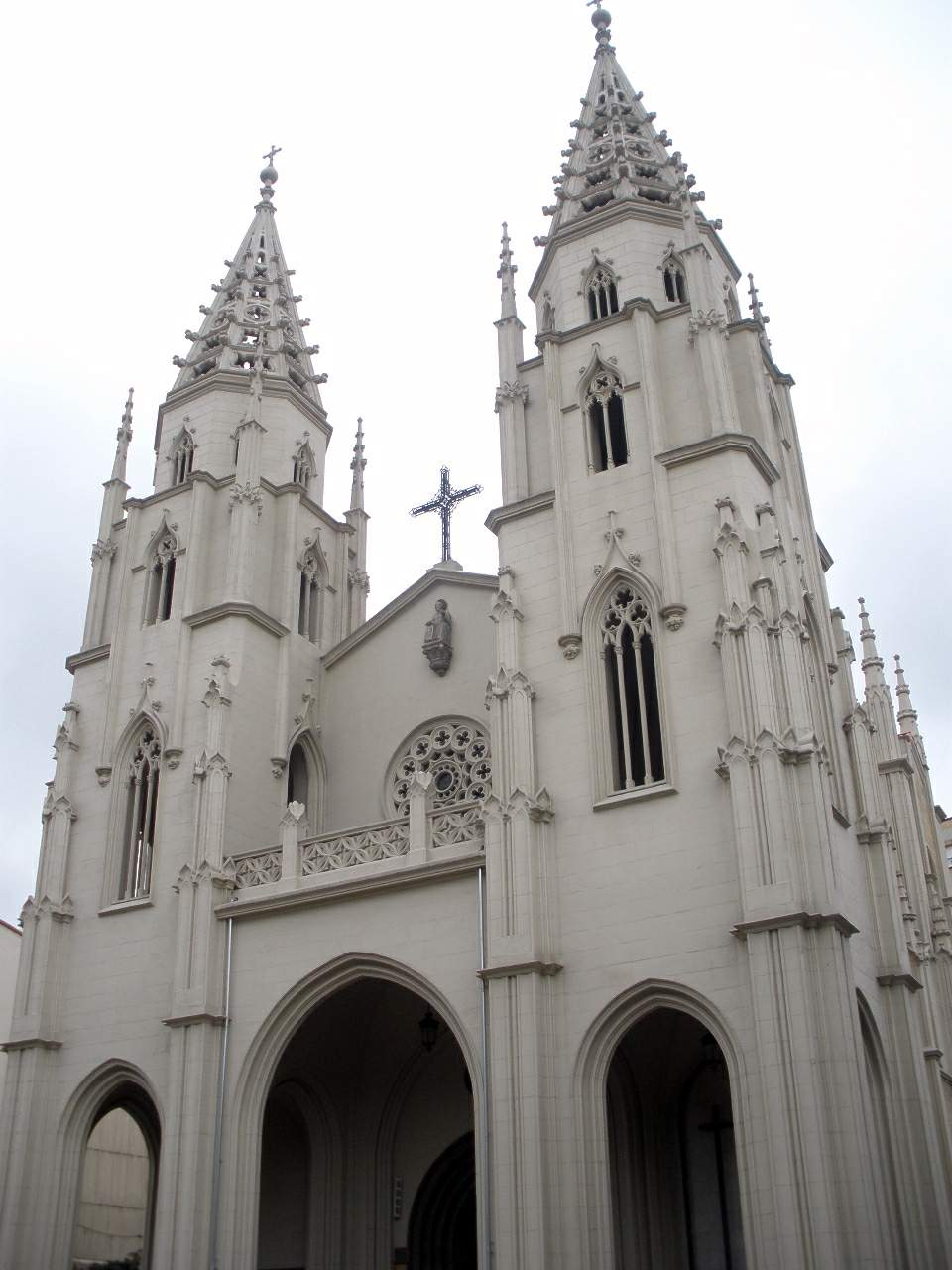
Santiago's church

Sama is the second largest parish of the city of Langreo / Llangréu, Asturies, in the north of Spain. It had 8,500 inhabitants within the urban area and 300 outside of it.The parish and district occupy an area of 5.47 km^{2}. In the past, Sama was an important commercial and mining zone.

== History ==
Sama de Langreo become a parish in 1887 when it was separated from the Ciañu parish. The region where the current parish stands was a fertile plot of land next to the Nalón river, including structures such as the 15th century "Casa de los Notarios," demolished in 2019. There was a chapel dedicated to Saint John in which Aurelio was crowned king of Asturias in 768.

In the 19th century, administrative work began to take place in Sama, which was growing in population due to a coal mining boom. During the Third Carlist War, the Town Hall, containing the Langreo historical archive, was destroyed.

In the mid-19th century, the large Duro Felguera steelworks was built in the neighbouring town of La Felguera, and with it numerous secondary industries appeared which in turn required coal, causing the towns of Langreo to grow constantly. With industrialisation, at the end of the 19th century and beginning of the 20th century, schools, a food and livestock market, cinemas and theatres (the Teatro Vital Aza was the first in the region), a casino, the Sanatorio Adaro mining hospital, working-class and upper-class neighbourhoods, and other project were built in Sama. The railway arrived in 1856 when the "Villa de Gijón" locomotive of the Langreo Railway entered Sama. Commercial activity is also of particular importance, leaving its mark on many of the town's buildings, some of which were inspired by Art Deco or modernism, and others with a rationalist and very urban design. In the last quarter of the 19th century, during the Restoration period, Antonio María Dorado, a local conservative politician, who was mayor of Langreo for a total of 18 years on an intermittent basis, was of particular importance in the town. He had a special interest in consolidating the urban system of Sama, opening streets and squares, regulating the weekly market, building the new town hall and the parish church, bringing water to the public fountains and strengthening municipal power. His contacts with high political spheres such as Alejandro Pidal y Mon favoured the construction of infrastructure.

Industrial activity in Langreo, similar to that which characterized Sama, continued to favor the demographic growth of the town, which, although less than that of its neighbor La Felguera, turned it into one of the largest urban centers in Asturias. The Asturian miners' strike of 1934 caused unrest within Sama. Socialist militiamen under the orders of Belarmino Tomás, who had formed the Revolutionary Committee of Sama de Langreo, attacked the Civil Guard barracks, located in a tenement house, killing almost all 80 Civil Guards and Assault Guards who defended it, including its captain José Alonso Nart, who received the Laureate Cross of Saint Ferdinand. The insurrection caused damage to other buildings as the miner's passed through on the way to Oviedo.

After the Spanish Civil War, the era of autocracy was beneficial for the economy of the region, but it lost importance with the creation of Aceralia and the progressive transfer of industrial activity to other parts of Asturias. In the 1990s, the two large mining pits in Sama, Fondón and Modesta, were closed. In 2007, a fire on an underground coal transport belt to the Modesta Washhouse made it necessary to evacuate hundreds of residents of the town due to a cloud of toxic gas. This caused the definitive closure of the washhouse, the last industrial facility in the town.

The commercial center of Sama is Antonio María Dorado street. On the banks of the Nalón River is Dorado Park, from the period between centuries and included in the Cultural Heritage of Asturias. The parish church is in the neo-Gothic style, rebuilt after the Civil War and dedicated to James the Great. Today the industrial and economic crisis of the mining regions has reduced the commercial activity that characterized Sama until a few decades ago, also affecting its demographic weight, going from the 15,000 inhabitants it once had to the current 8,500. It has two important cultural centers, the Cine Felgueroso Audiovisual Center and the museum of Pozo Fondón-Archivo de Hunosa, as well as a Cultural Center. Sama also houses the Nalón Valley Music Conservatory, a health center, Sanatorio Adaro and a Secondary Education Institute. It is also the seat of the Langreo Courts.

== Celebrations ==
The feast of St. James is celebrated around July 25, when the popular Mining Shoreworker Competition, one of the oldest in Spain, is held. In addition, Los Güevos Pintos (Easter Monday) and Carnival are also celebrated, when the Antroxu Menu is served. For more than a decade, the Hoguera de San Juan was celebrated in the neighborhood of La Llera, with a falla in the Nalón River. In 2010 the celebration was put to an end due to its banning by the Cantabrian Hydrographic Confederation.

== Places of interest ==
- Church of Santiago

== Notable residents ==
- Rosanna Castrillo Diaz, artist
- Lluis Xabel Álvarez, philosopher and writer
- Mariano Bartelmi, footballer
- Narciso Ibáñez Menta
- María José Ramos Rubiera
