= War Memorial Opera House =

Opera house in San Francisco, California, United States

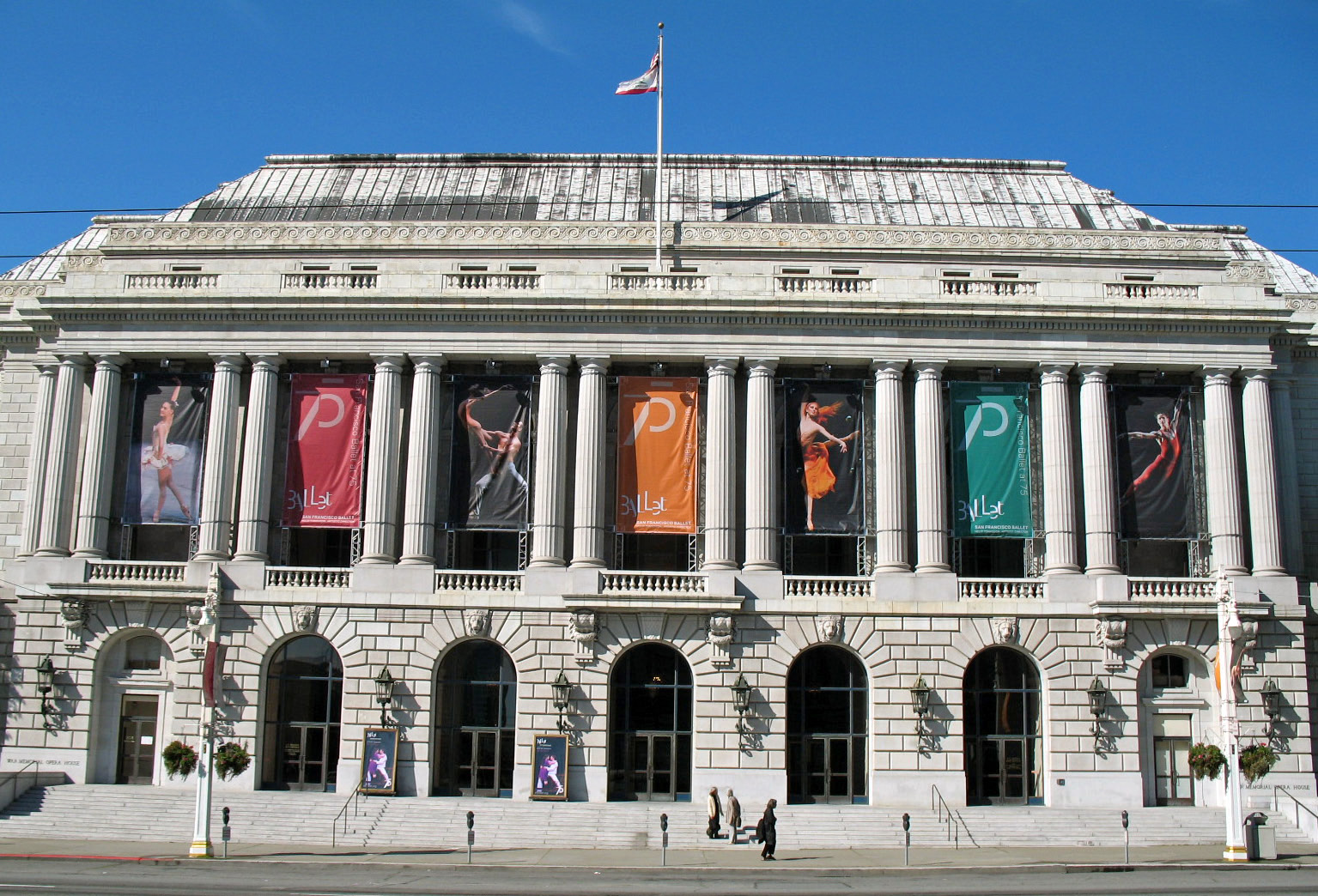

- Location in Central San Francisco
- Address: 301 Van Ness Avenue; San Francisco, California; United States
- Coordinates: 37.7786°N 122.4208°W
- Owner: San Francisco War Memorial and Performing Arts Center
- Capacity: 3,146 seated 200 standing
- Type: Opera house
- Public transit: Civic Center; Van Ness

Construction
- Opened: 1932
- Rebuilt: 1993
- Architects: Arthur Brown Jr., G. Albert Lansburgh

Tenants
- San Francisco Opera, San Francisco Ballet

Website
- sfwarmemorial.org

The War Memorial Opera House is an opera house in San Francisco, California, United States, located on the western side of Van Ness Avenue across from the west side/rear facade of San Francisco City Hall.

It is part of the San Francisco War Memorial and Performing Arts Center. It has been the home of the San Francisco Opera since opening night in 1932.

It was the site of the San Francisco Conference, the first assembly of the newly organized United Nations in April 1945.

It was also where the Treaty of San Francisco was signed, which reestablished peaceful relations between Japan and the Allies after World War II in September 1951.

== Architecture ==
In 1927, $4 million in municipal bonds were issued to finance the design and construction of the first municipally owned opera house in the United States. The architects of the building complex were Arthur Brown Jr., who had also designed the adjacent San Francisco City Hall between 1912 and 1916, and G. Albert Lansburgh, a theater designer responsible for San Francisco's Orpheum and the Shrine Auditorium in Los Angeles.

Completed in 1932, it employs the classic Roman Doric order in a reserved and sober form appropriate to its function commemorating all those who served in World War I (1914/17–1918). A colonnade of paired columns screens colossal arch-headed windows above a severe rusticated basement, a scheme that was influenced by the severe design of the Louvre Colonnade.

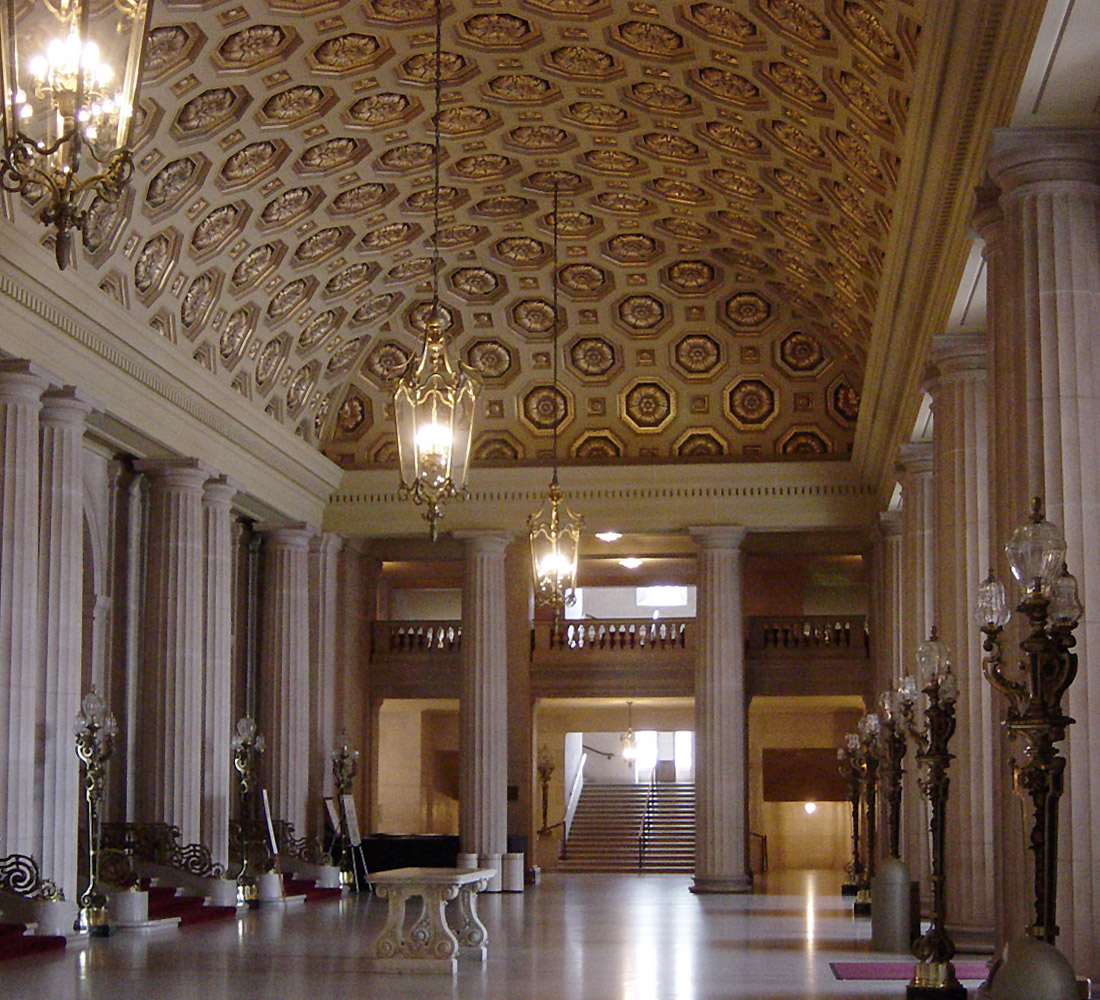
The lobby has staircases with overlooks at each end and entrances to the main level at left.

The interior contains a grand entrance hall with a high barrel vaulted and coffered ceiling parallel to the street, with overlooks from staircase landings at each end.

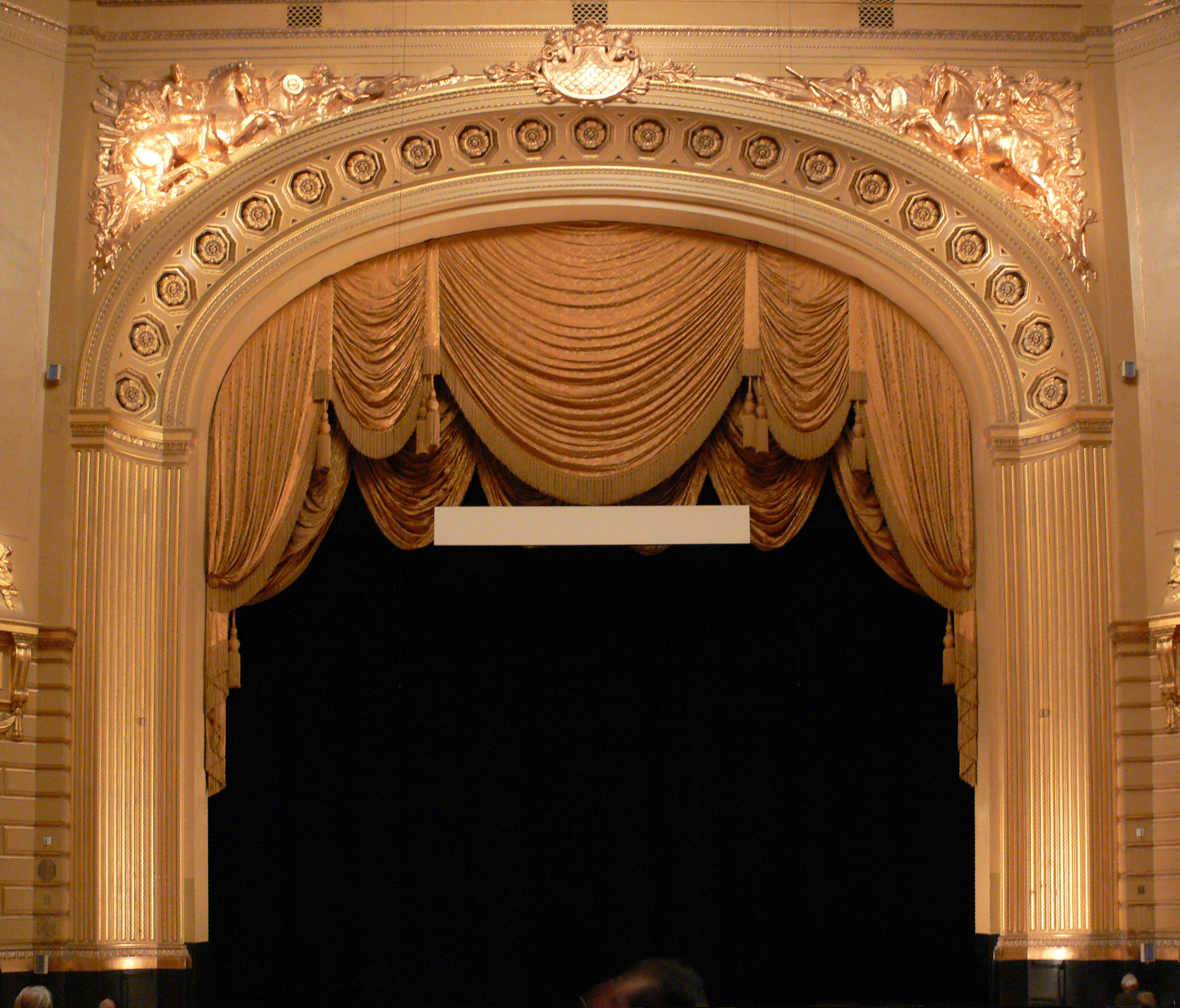
Stage and proscenium

The theater space is dominated by a massive aluminum and glass panel chandelier under a blue vault, and the proscenium arch is decorated with gilded figurative sculpture. The theater has 3,146 seats plus standing room for 200 behind the orchestra and balcony sections.

== History ==
The War Memorial Opera House was given its inaugural opening on October 15, 1932, with a performance of Giacomo Puccini's Tosca by the San Francisco Opera. The performance was led by Claudia Muzio as the title heroine with Dino Borgioli as Mario Cavaradossi and Alfredo Gandolfi as Baron Scarpia. The production was staged by Armando Agnini and the music forces were led by conductor Gaetano Merola.

The San Francisco Symphony performed most of its concerts in the house, from 1932 to 1980.

In spring of 1945, the United Nations had its San Francisco Conference (UN Conference on International Organization) first organizing assembly there. The UN Charter was later drafted and signed in the Herbst Theatre next door. Six years later in 1951, the Treaty of San Francisco, declaring peace with Japan was drafted and signed here and in the Herbst Theatre.

During the years of Kurt Herbert Adler's general directorship, the inadequacies of the house became apparent as the season was expanded. In particular, there was a lack of office space and rehearsal space. In 1974, The Pointer Sisters were the first pop act to perform at the theatre. In 1979 the backstage area was extended, followed in 1981 by the opening of a new wing built onto the house on the Franklin Street side. This gave spaces for sets, coaches, and dancers as well as more administrative space. At the same time, the nearby Zellerbach Rehearsal Hall, with a stage the same size as that of the Opera House, was opened as part of the complex which included the Louise M. Davies Symphony Hall.

In 1989, the Loma Prieta earthquake caused major damage to the Opera House. The architectural firm of Skidmore, Owings & Merrill and the theatrical consulting firm of Auerbach and Associates were retained in 1992 to oversee the building's technical renovation and a seismic retrofit. At this time additional private donations were raised for extensive technical improvements. These include:

- State-of-the-art lighting system – which at the time, made it one of the most extensive and sophisticated systems in the world.
- Replacement of chambers for a never-installed organ with modern restrooms, sorely needed since the original construction. The organ is not needed with the completion of the nearby Davies Symphony Hall.
- An underground extension below the neighboring plaza to accommodate additional dressing rooms and backstage facilities.

== Appearances in media ==
- Foul Play, directed by Colin Higgins
- Heart and Souls, directed by Ron Underwood
- Steve Jobs, directed by Danny Boyle

== Bibliography ==
- Tilman, Jeffrey T. Arthur Brown Jr.: Progressive Classicist. New York: W.W. Norton, 2006
