= San Francisco War Memorial and Performing Arts Center =

Performing arts center in San Francisco, California

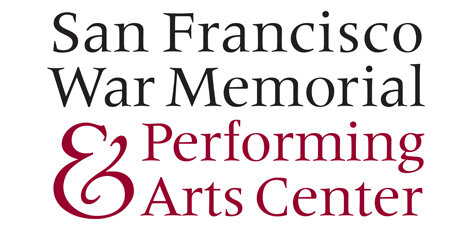

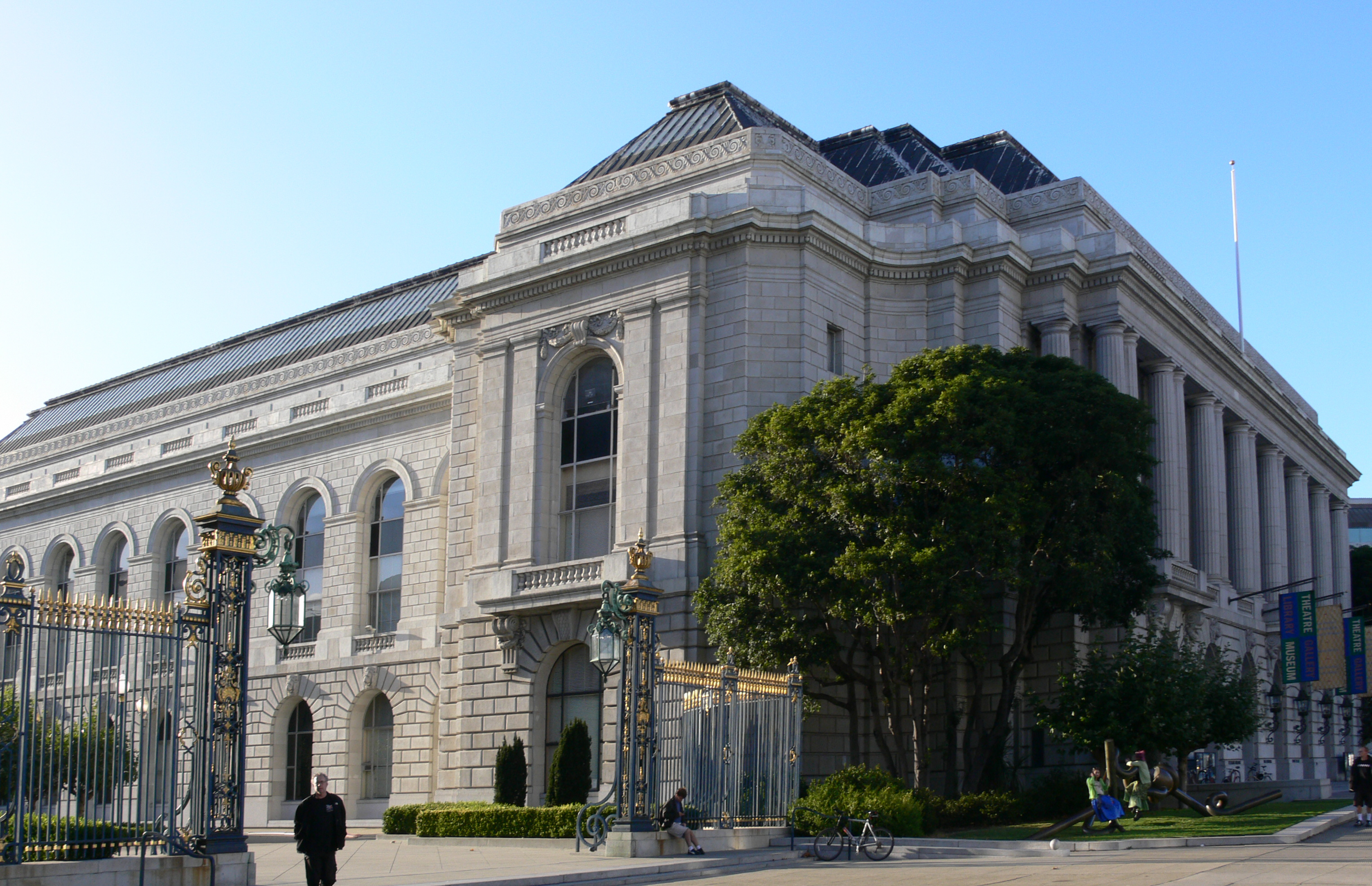
- Beaux-Arts style War Memorial Veterans Building and courtyard park, seen from Van Ness Avenue.

- Location within San Francisco County Location within California Location within the United States
- Address: 401 Van Ness Ave #110
- Location: San Francisco, California, United States
- Coordinates: 37°46′44.83″N 122°25′13.64″W
- Capacity: Herbst: 928; Davies: 2,743; Opera House: 3,146
- Type: Performing arts center

Construction
- Opened: 1920

Website
- sfwarmemorial.org

San Francisco Designated Landmark
- Designated: 1977
- Reference no.: 84

The San Francisco War Memorial and Performing Arts Center (SFWMPAC) is located in San Francisco, California. It is one of the largest performing arts centers in the United States. It covers 7.5 acres (3.0 hectares) in the Civic Center Historic District, and totals 7,500 seats among its venues.

== Performing arts ==
Opera, symphony, modern and classical dance, theatre, popular music, plays, lectures, meetings, receptions, special screenings, and gala events all have a place and occur at the Center.

== History ==
The complex was developed in the 1920s on two blocks on Van Ness Avenue facing San Francisco City Hall from the west. The "War Memorial" name commemorates all the people who served in the First World War, which ended seven years before the project commenced. It was designed by Arthur Brown Jr in 1927-1928, and is one of the last Beaux-Arts style structures erected in the United States. The project resulted in the construction of a matched pair of buildings across a formal courtyard park: the War Memorial Opera House; and the multi-purpose Veterans Building next door. Both were completed and opened in 1932.

The upper floors of the Veterans Building housed the San Francisco Museum of Modern Art (formerly the San Francisco Museum of Art) from 1935 to 1994. In 1980 the new Louise M. Davies Symphony Hall opened, on a site on Van Ness across the sidestreet from the Opera House, as part of the SFWMPAC complex.

=== United Nations ===
The SFWMPAC has historical significance. On June 26, 1945, the United Nations Charter was signed in the Veterans Building's Herbst Theatre by the group of 50 founding nations, following the two-month-long United Nations conference in the Opera House.

In 1951, the Peace Treaty with Japan (commonly called "Treaty of San Francisco"), formally ending World War II hostilities with Japan, was signed in the Opera House. The Center has been host to U.S. presidents and foreign heads of state. In 1990 the Center was chosen to host the first Goldman Environmental Prize ceremony, and this prize is now presented annually at the Center.

== Performing arts venues ==
Four venues comprise the San Francisco War Memorial and Performing Arts Center—SFWMPAC:

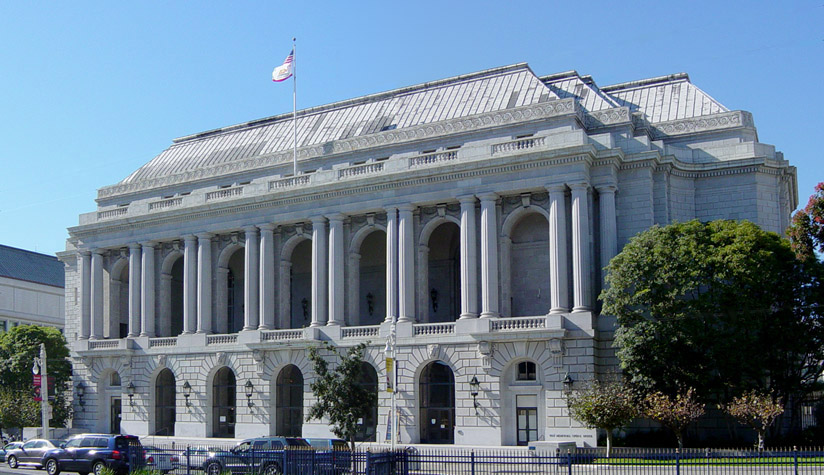
War Memorial Opera House, venue in the SFWMPAC

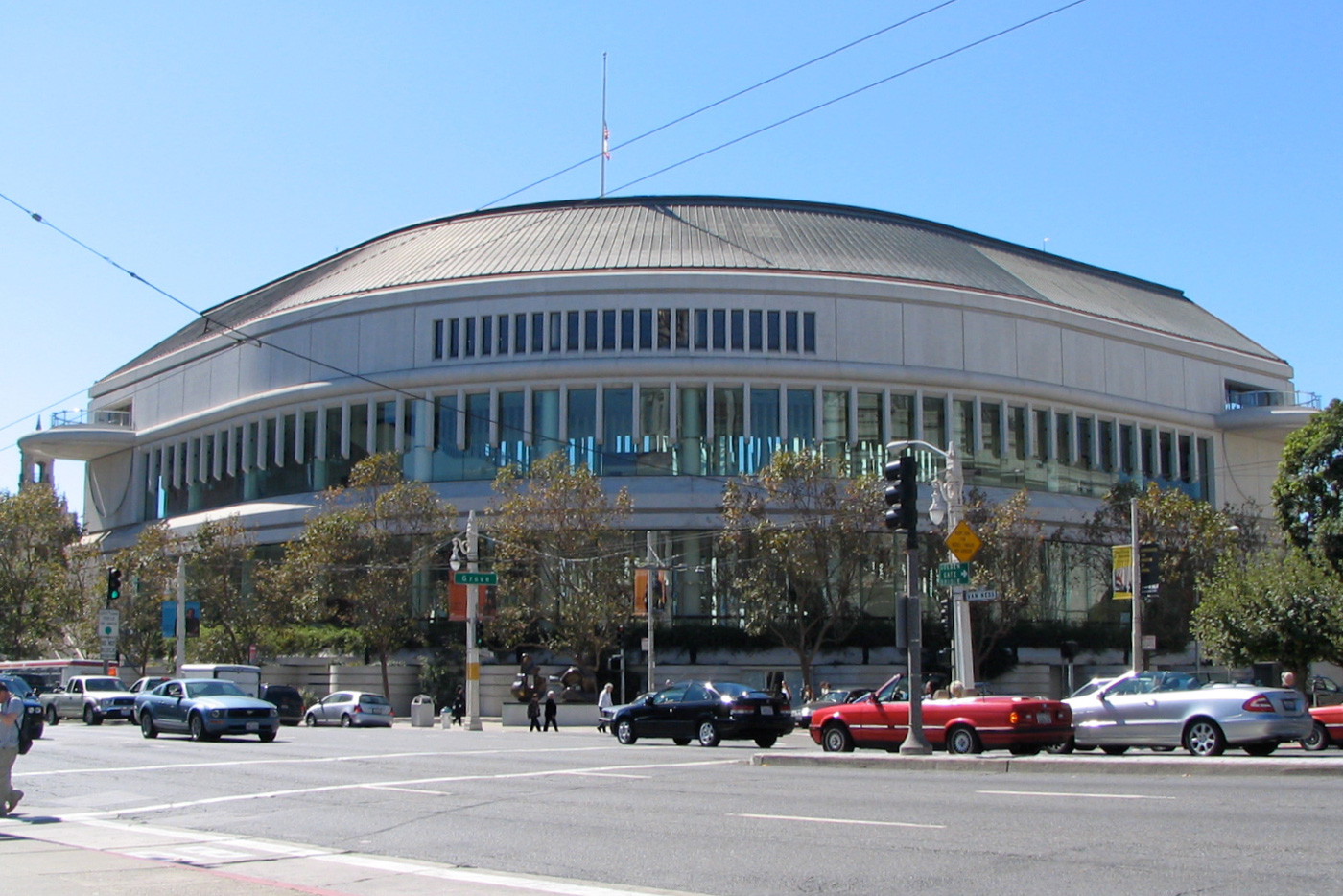
Louise M. Davies Symphony Hall, venue in the SFWMPAC.

=== War Memorial Opera House building ===
The War Memorial Opera House, or the Opera House, with 3,146 seats, was built in 1932 as part of the original War Memorial Building. It has been the home of the San Francisco Opera since 1932, as well as the San Francisco Ballet.

=== Veterans Building ===
- The Herbst Theatre, with 916 seats, is a small concert and lecture/presentation hall. It is a part of the original Veterans Building named the “Veterans Auditorium”. In 1945, the United Nations Charter was signed here. In 1977, the theater was refurbished and renamed.
- The Green Room is located on the second floor of the Veterans Building. Originally designed as a lounge for World War I veterans, the room serves as a performance and reception hall. Several concert and lecture series are held in the Green Room each year, as well as dinners, receptions, fashion shows, recitals, conferences and meetings. The room is also a prime location for fashion photography and video.
- The San Francisco Arts Commission Gallery is located in the northeast corner of the Veterans Building. The gallery hosts changing exhibitions of contemporary art.

=== Davies Symphony Hall building ===
Louise M. Davies Symphony Hall opened in 1980 and, with 2,743 seats, is the major symphony hall of the city. It has been the home of the San Francisco Symphony since its opening.

=== Zellerbach Rehearsal Hall ===
Harold L. Zellerbach Rehearsal Hall is located at the corner of Franklin and Hayes streets, directly adjacent to Louise M. Davies Symphony Hall. Zellerbach Rehearsal Hall has three rehearsal facilities, which can be used for rehearsals and movie shoots.
