= Rosana Castrillo Diaz =

Spanish artist (born 1971)

- Born: 1971 (age 54–55); Sama, Asturias, Spain
- Education: Complutense University of Madrid; Cleveland Institute of Art; The School of the Museum of Fine Arts; Mills College
- Awards: SECA Art Award (2004)

Rosana Castrillo Diaz (born 1971) is a Spanish artist.

== Early life and education ==
Rosana Castrillo Diaz was born in Sama de Langreo, Asturias, Spain. She earned her Bachelor of Fine Arts (BFA) from the Complutense University of Madrid and an additional BFA from the Cleveland Institute of Art. Rosana has a Post Bac degree from the School of the Museum of Fine Arts, Boston. She received her Master of Fine Arts degree from Mills College.

== Work ==
Castrillo won the SECA Art Award from the San Francisco Museum of Modern Art in 2004 and Artadia Art Award in 2005. She is represented by Anthony Meier Fine Arts in San Francisco.

=== Themes ===
Diaz produces graphite-on-paper drawings, wall relief sculptures, and installations primarily in monochromatic all-white. In her work, she investigates invisibility, the everyday, solidity and immateriality.

According to Janet Bishop, a curator at the San Francisco Museum of Modern Art, Castrillo Diaz saw a 2000 SFMOMA retrospective of the art of Sol LeWitt, which had an impact on her work: for example, her large ephemeral drawings using Scotch tape. These works hang from the wall and move with the air, so that only their shadows remain constant; the work can appear invisible at one angle or look three-dimensional at another angle. Speaking of her tape drawings and white-on-white pieces, Castrillo Diaz has said, “My interest is in quiet, in simplicity, and in the kind of space that is in the periphery and is not quite there, or you don’t know whether it’s there or not." The work has also been described as “an attempt to redefine drawing in a three-dimensional… form.”

=== Exhibitions and collections ===
Her work has been exhibited in numerous exhibits, including at the Berkeley Art Museum and Pacific Film Archive, San Jose Institute of Contemporary Art, the Wattis Institute for Contemporary Arts and The Drawing Center. In 2009, the San Francisco Museum of Modern Art commissioned Diaz to create a mural, Untitled (162 in. x 1101 in./ 411.48 cm x 2796.54 cm ) for the bridge to the museum's rooftop garden; the mural was funded by a gift of Robert and Claudia Allen and the Mary Heath Keesling Fund. Using white paint and applying patterns of highly reflective mica, which can also make light look very white, Diaz painted the window-facing wall of the bridge to take advantage of the light flooding into the glass-walled corridor. Thinking about how the viewer's perception of the piece changes as he or she walks across the bridge, Castrillo Diaz also felt “it needed to flow like water." In this mural, the white palette and reflectivity of the mica are both elements of the design; however, distinctions in white that can be seen from one angle may not be visible at another angle. Castrillo Diaz has said that when the distinctions disappear, the piece “comes to completion in a way.”

Castrillo-Diaz' work is in public and private collections, including the Whitney Museum of American Art, New York, NY; San Francisco Museum of Modern Art, San Francisco, CA; University of California, San Francisco, CA; and Mills College Art Museum, Oakland, CA.
