= Iglesia de Santiago (Arlós) =

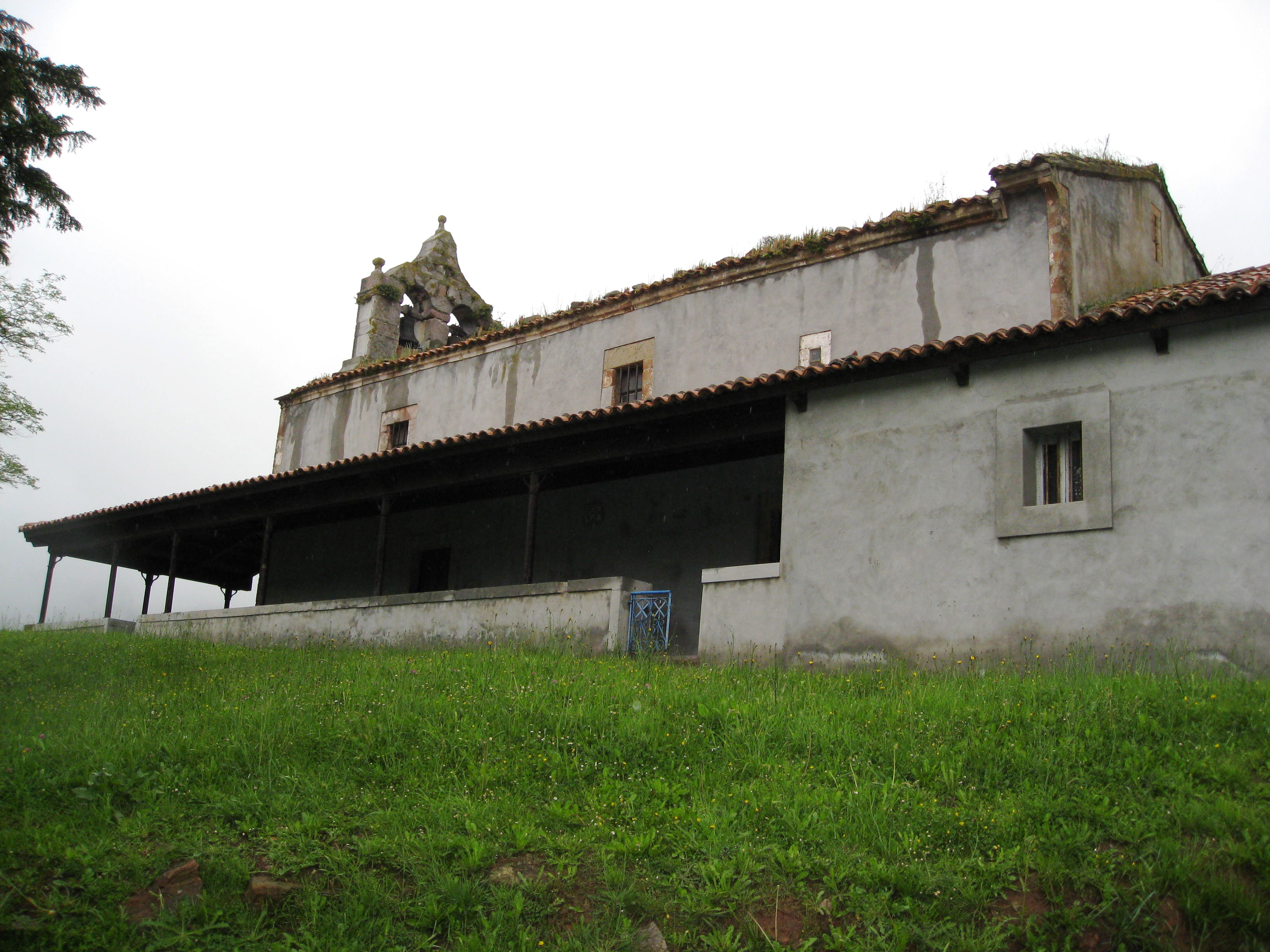
- Iglesia de Santiago (Arlós)
- 43.482298°N 5.904569°W
- Location: Asturias, Spain

Iglesia de Santiago (Arlós) is a church in Llanera, Asturias, Spain.
