= Iglesia de Santiago (Benicalaf) =

Coordinates: 39.738126°N 0.247851°W

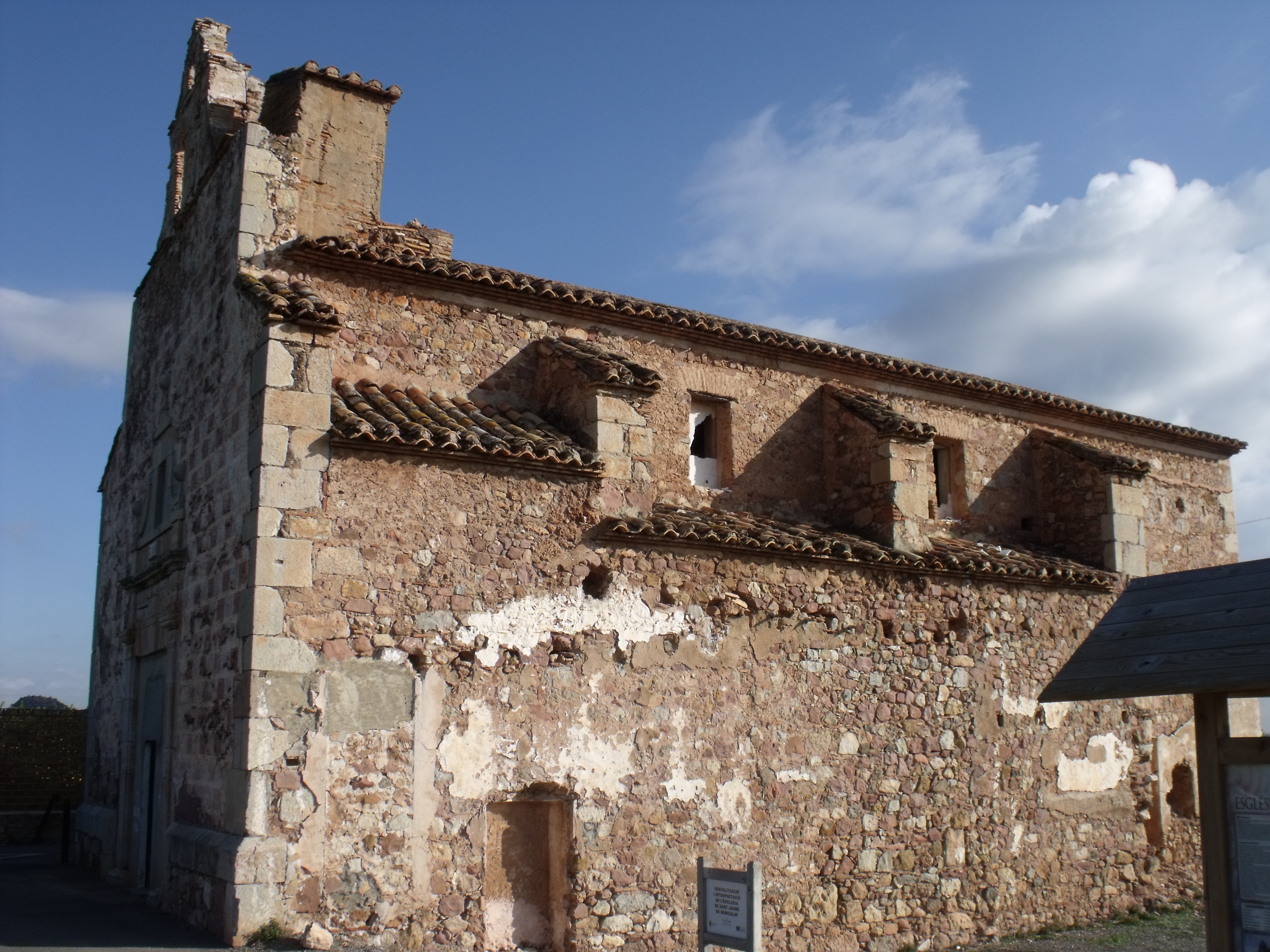
Church of Saint James

The Church of Saint James (Spanish, Iglesia de Santiago; Catalan, Església de Sant Jaume) is a former parish church in Spain. It is the only remaining building in Benicalaf, a formerly-populated village in the municipality of Benavites, in the comarca of Camp de Morvedre, Valencian Community. Constructed in the 19th century, it has been declared a Bien de Interés Cultural (46.12.052-003).

The church was built in 1856. By 1900, the parish was uninhabited and the building lost its standing as a church in 1901. During the 20th century, it was used as a warehouse and stockyard. Designed in the mannerist style, it is a rectangular building with a single nave divided into three sections. It has side chapels framed by half-point arches. The nave contains a barrel vault with lunettes and arches in the three sections. The vault is decorated with frescoes depicting the Eucharist, the Immaculate Concepcion, the Holy Trinity and the Apostles. The facade is covered with plaster and simulated stone blocks, which are painted. The belfry contains three arches.
