= Church of Santiago (Sama) =

Coordinates: 43°17′40″N 5°41′01″W

- Iglesia de Santiago
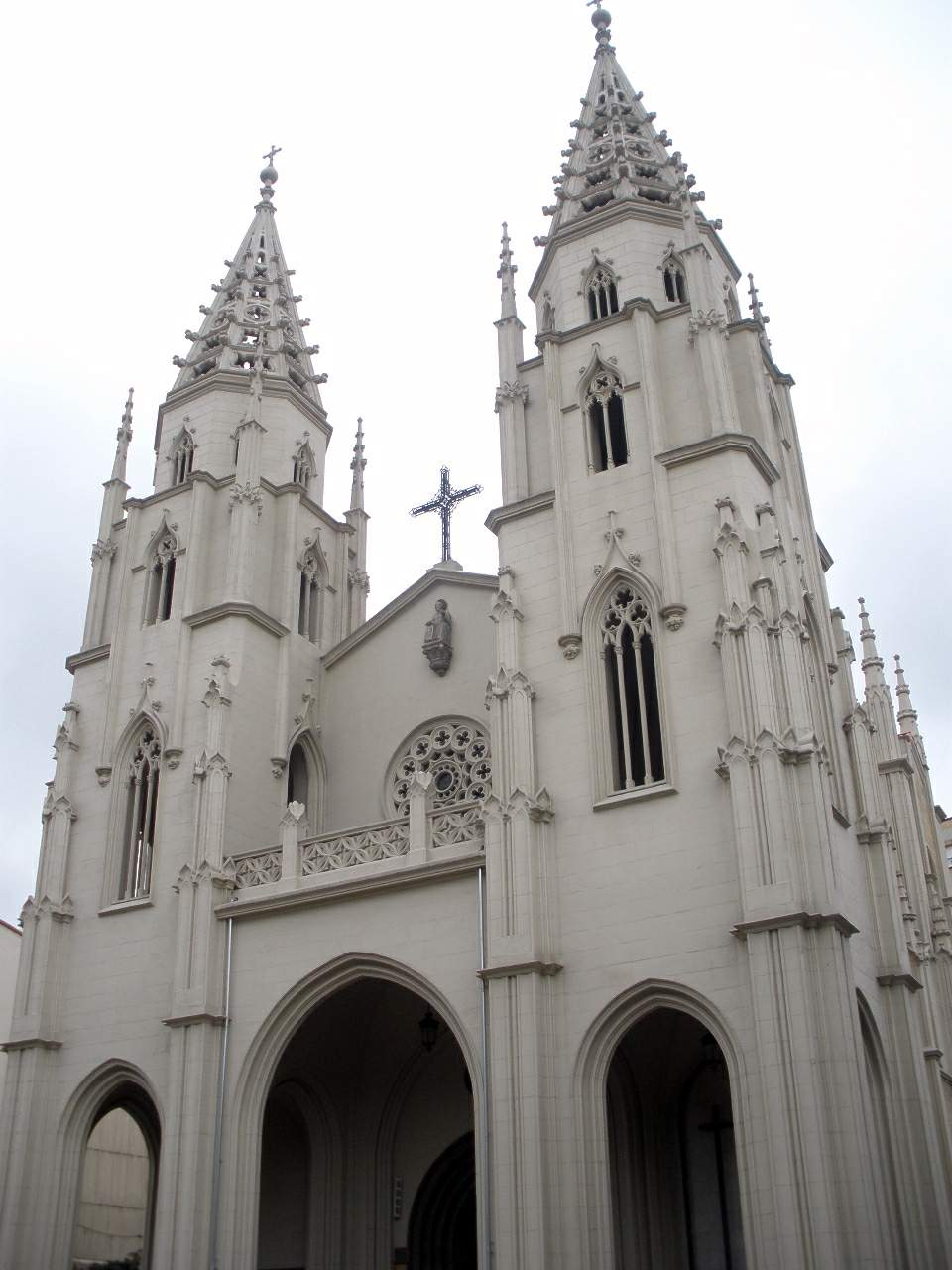
- The Church of Santiago in 2013
- Church of Santiago (Sama)
- Location: Sama, Langreo, Asturias, Spain

Architecture
- Architectural type: Neo-Gothic
- Years built: 19th century (original); 1950s (rebuild)
- Closed: October 1934 (original)

The Iglesia de Santiago (Spanish pronunciation: [iˈɣlesja ðe sanˈtjaɣo]) is a Neo-Gothic church in the locality of Sama, in the municipality of Langreo, Asturias, Spain.

A church similar in plan to the present, but simpler and not as tall, was first built in the 19th century and dedicated to San Eulogio. It was burned in October 1934, during the Spanish Civil War. It was rebuilt in the 1950s.

== See also ==
- Asturian art
- Catholic Church in Spain
