= Church of Santiago (A Coruña) =

Church building in La Coruña, Spain

Coordinates: 43°22′10″N 8°23′38″W

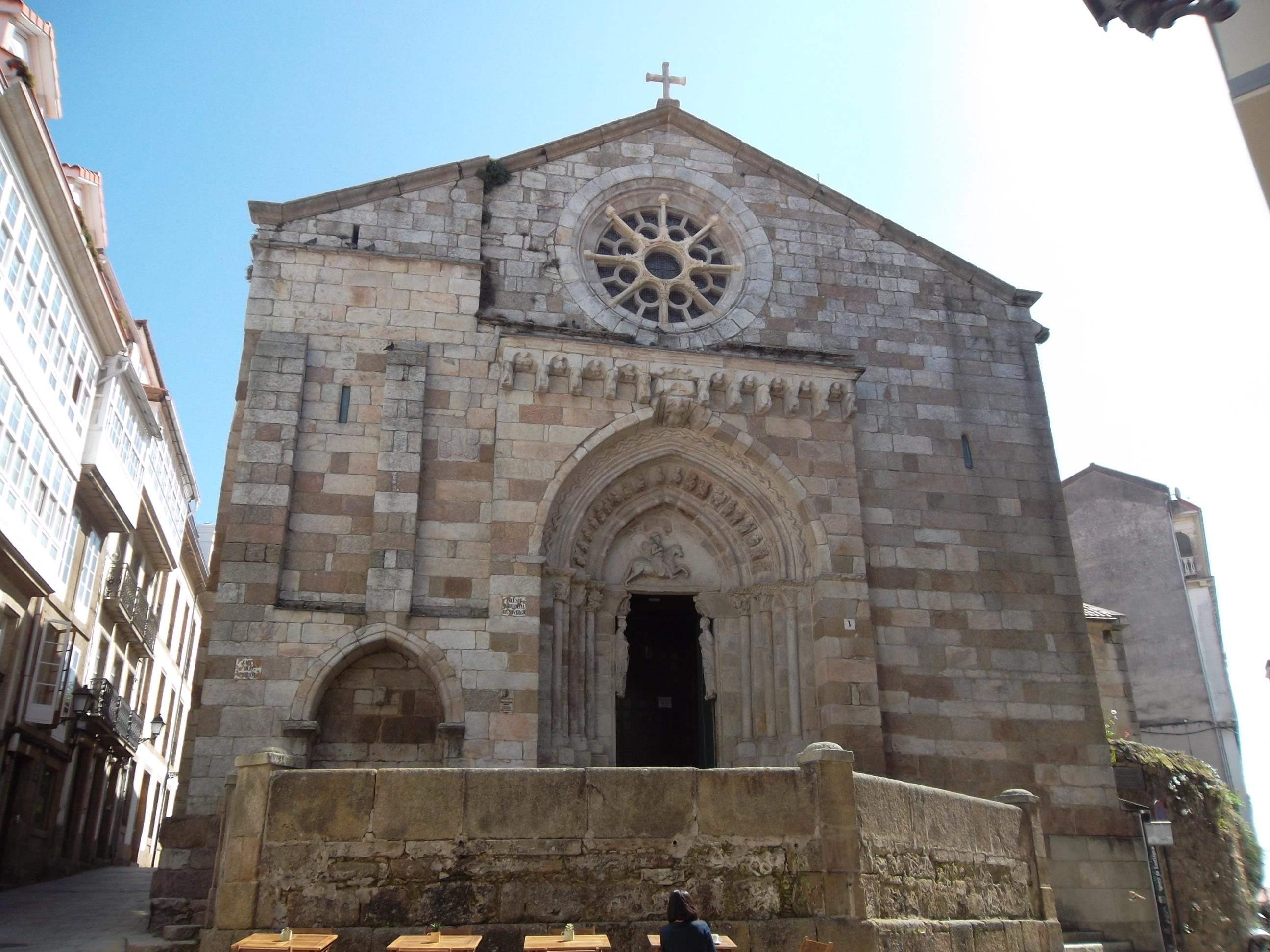
Main facade

The Church of Santiago (Galician: Igrexa de Santiago) is a catholic church in A Coruña, Galicia, Spain. Founded in the 12th century, it's the oldest religious temple in the city. It became a historic monument (now Bien de Interés Cultural) on 18 August 1972.

== History ==
It was built in the second half of the 12th century in Romanesque style, although it underwent subsequent renovations due to fires. The interior houses some Roman altars from the Tower of Hercules. In the Middle Ages it was considered the most important church in A Coruña, to such an extent that the City Council met in its atrium until the end of the 15th century.
