= Herbst Theatre =

Auditorium in San Francisco, United States

- Veterans Auditorium
- Location within San Francisco Location within California
- Address: 401 Van Ness Avenue; San Francisco, California; United States
- Coordinates: 37.779653°N 122.420544°W
- Owner: San Francisco War Memorial and Performing Arts Center
- Capacity: 928

Construction
- Opened: 1915

The Herbst Theatre is an auditorium in the War Memorial and Performing Arts Center in the Civic Center, San Francisco. The 928-seat hall hosts programs such as City Arts & Lectures, SFJAZZ Center, and San Francisco Performances.

== Architecture and decoration ==
Originally designed as the Veterans Auditorium, the theatre was refurbished and renamed Herbst Theatre in 1977 in honor of brothers Herman and Maurice Herbst, whose foundation underwrote the renovations. It is entered through a foyer off of the building's main lobby. Eight large beaux-arts murals, created by Frank Brangwyn for the 1915 Panama–Pacific International Exposition, adorn the walls while overhead five chandeliers hang from the blue and gold-leaf ceiling.

== United Nations Charter ==
On June 26, 1945, the United Nations Charter was signed on the stage of the Herbst Theatre by the group of 50 founding nations, following the two-month-long United Nations conference at the War Memorial Opera House.

== See also ==
- List of concert halls
