= Hibernia Bank Building (San Francisco) =

Historic bank building in San Francisco, California

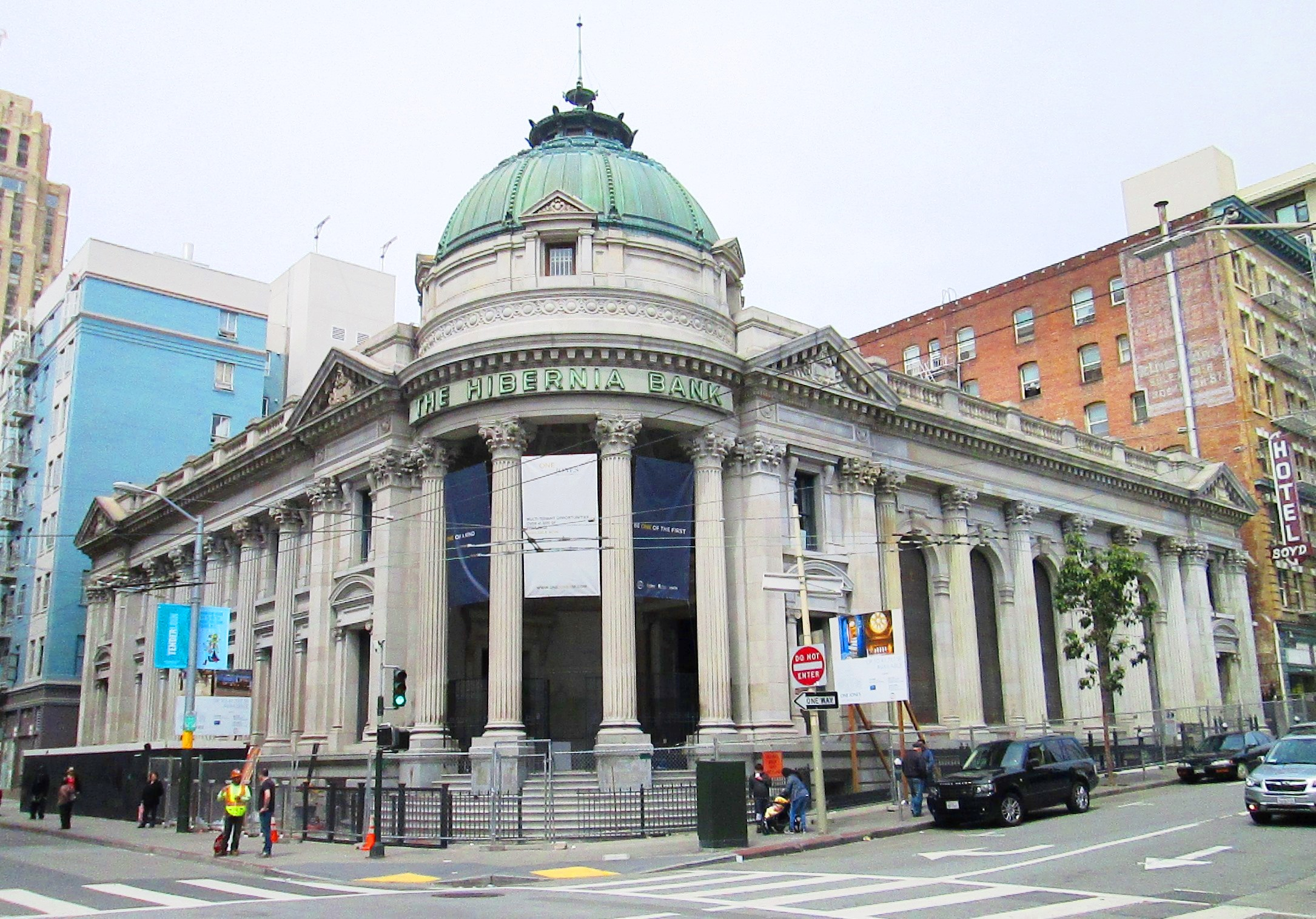
- (2017)

- Location within San Francisco County
- Alternative names: The Hibernia

General information
- Type: bank
- Location: 1 Jones St; San Francisco, California
- Coordinates: 37.7812593°N 122.414381°W
- Completed: 1892; 1906

San Francisco Designated Landmark
- Designated: August 2, 1981
- Reference no.: 130

The Hibernia Bank Building is a Beaux-Arts former bank building at 1 Jones Street, at the corner of McAllister and Market Streets, in San Francisco, California. It was built in 1892 as the headquarters of the Hibernia Savings and Loan Society and designed by Albert Pissis. Slightly damaged in the 1906 earthquake and fire, it re-opened again just five weeks after the calamity. Pissis designed an addition to the building in 1908.

The bank left the building in 1985, and, after a brief period in which it was used by the San Francisco Police Department, the building was vacant for decades, until it was restored and renovated in 2016. As of 2017, the building, re-branded as "The Hibernia", is being subdivided for leasing to tenants who need less than the building's overall 42,000 square feet (3,900 m^{2}) of space.

The Hibernia Bank Building is a designated San Francisco landmark.

== Early history ==
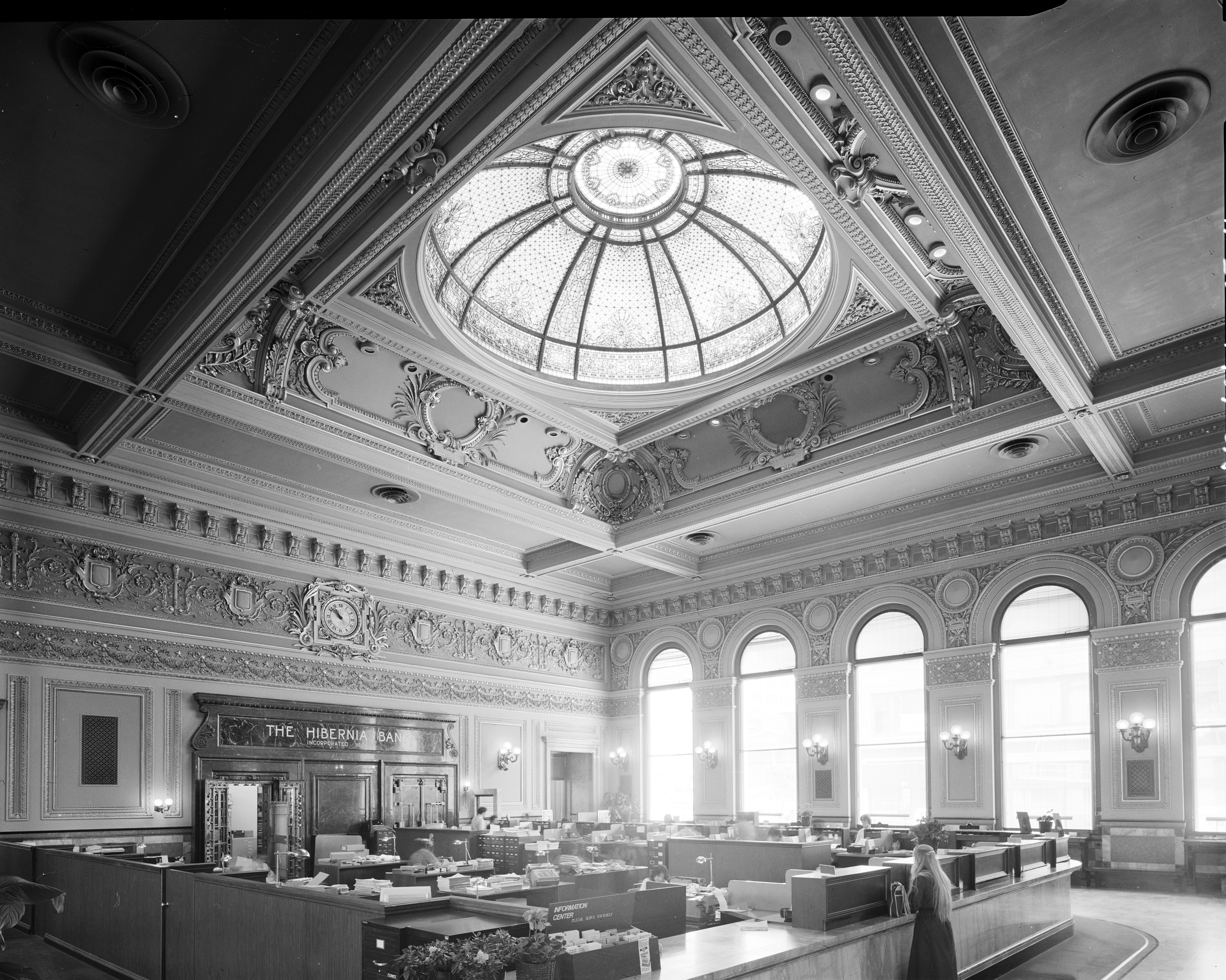
The banking room in the building, as documented by the Historic American Buildings Survey

In 1892, the bank's new headquarters at 1 Jones Street, on the corner of McAllister and Market Streets, were completed; it was designed by Albert Pissis in the Beaux-Arts style and was referred to by San Franciscans as "The Paragon". In a poll of 20 artists made by the San Francisco Call shortly after the building was completed, 14 of the artists voted for the new building as the "best" in San Francisco; the next building (the Mills Building) received only 4 votes. Pissis also designed an expansion of the building, which was completed in 1908.

The building largely survived the 1906 earthquake and fire, taking some damage from the fire. It was one of the first buildings to be restored afterwards, re-opening on May 25, 1906, just five weeks later.

== Later history ==
The building was designated an official San Francisco Landmark on August 2, 1981.

The Hibernia Savings and Loan Society left the building in 1985.

The building at 1 Jones Street was used by the San Francisco Police Department beginning in the 1990's as the location for their Tenderloin Task Force until 2000 when the Tenderloin Police Station was completed. The building was then purchased by an out-of-town investor. Eight years later, with the building vacant, it was bought by a local real estate investor for $3.95 million, despite the attempts of a consortium of organizations to create a cultural arts center there, including museums dedicated to radio and music. The new owner spent some time looking for a single tenant for the building's 42,000 square feet (3,900 m^{2}) of space, but it remained vacant. By 2013. the building was marred by graffiti and the sidewalk in front of it was often the site of drug sales and public urination, but in early 2016, the building received a $15 million renovation and restoration, along with earthquake-retrofitting.

On May 26, 2016, Presidential candidate Hillary Clinton held a fund-raising event in the renovated building.

In 2017, not having found a tenant who would take the entire building, the building was re-branded as "One Jones" and began to be subdivided for tenants needing smaller amounts of space. The successful redevelopment of the building is seen as important for the revitalization of the Tenderloin as a neighborhood.

== See also ==
- List of San Francisco Designated Landmarks
- Hibernia Bank Building (New Orleans), built in 1921 as headquarters for the unrelated Hibernia National Bank
