= The White House (department store) =

Department store in San Francisco, California, US (1854–1965)

Coordinates: 37.7896°N 122.40530°W

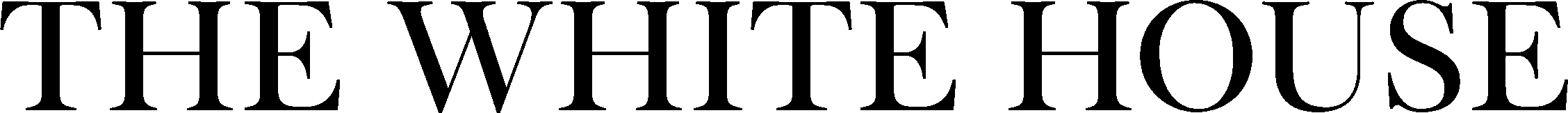
The White House logo

Name plate of The White House

The White House was the first department store in San Francisco; it opened in 1854 and closed in 1965. It was originally named Davidson & Lane, then J.W. Davidson & Company, and finally, in 1870, when it moved to a large new building, took the name "The White House".

In 1885, Lane retired, and Raphael Weill (1837-1920) continued with his brother, Henry Weill, Eugene Gallvis and Albert Roullier as partners. All four were Jewish and French by birth. Raphael Weill, who came to San Francisco in 1855, was a prominent "philanthropist, epicure, and patron of the arts". Weill was a French Jew born in Phalsbourg, Lorraine, France. He arrived in San Francisco in 1853, joined the firm in 1855 at age 18, became a partner in 1858, and in 1885, became senior partner. He was a prominent member of the Bohemian Club, a founder of the French Library, and a patron of the French Hospital. He was an uncle of the founding brothers of Lazard Frères. Weill was appointed as a chevalier of the French Légion d'honneur in 1908. He died in 1920.

In the 19th century, the company was known for its progressive treatment of its employees, closing at 6pm and on holidays, offering annual paid vacations, paid sick time, and commissions on sales.

The Davidson & Lane Dry Goods Company originally opened in 1854 at the corner of Post and Grant. It moved to Kearny and Post on December 7, 1870, with the new name, The White House. After that store burned down in the 1906 San Francisco earthquake, the third location, designed by Albert Pissis and clad in white terra cotta, was at Sutter and Grant, with street address 256 Grant Avenue. In July 1960, an Oakland branch opened in Kaiser Center, at 20th and Webster. The White House, San Francisco department store, closed on January 1, 1965, at which time it was housed in four buildings.

After remaining vacant for several years, the main building reopened as a parking garage on the upper floors, with restaurants and retail stores including Tiffany & Co. and Peck and Peck at street level. As of 2021, the primary ground floor tenant is Banana Republic.
