= Hibernia Bank (San Francisco) =

Defunct bank based in San Francisco, California

- Formerly: Hibernia Savings and Loan Society
- Industry: Banking
- Founded: 1859
- Founder: John Sullivan
- Defunct: August 21, 1988
- Fate: Merged into Security Pacific National Bank
- Headquarters: San Francisco, United States

Hibernia Bank, founded in 1859 by John Sullivan as the Hibernia Savings and Loan Society, was a San Francisco savings bank that operated until its 1988 merger into Security Pacific. It helped finance San Francisco's growth during the nineteenth century and was California's largest bank by 1900. From 1892 to 1985, the bank occupied the Hibernia Bank Building at 1 Jones Street.

== History ==
The Hibernia Savings and Loan Society opened in April 1859 in a small office at the corner of Jackson and Montgomery streets, soon moving to larger quarters nearby. In 1892 it moved into a purpose-built Beaux-Arts headquarters designed by Albert Pissis at 1 Jones Street, at the corner of Market and McAllister streets. The building was only slightly damaged in the 1906 earthquake and fire, and the bank reopened there on May 25, 1906, five weeks after the disaster.

In April 1974, the bank's branch in the Sunset District was robbed by the Symbionese Liberation Army, with the kidnapped heiress Patty Hearst participating.

First Pacific acquired Hibernia in 1982. The bank left the Jones Street building in 1985. In 1988, Security Pacific agreed to acquire it for $160 million; at the time, Hibernia had approximately $1.57 billion in assets and 35 branches, 28 of them in the Bay Area. Hibernia merged into Security Pacific National Bank on August 21, 1988. Security Pacific National Bank in turn merged into Bank of America National Trust and Savings Association on April 22, 1992.
