= United Nations Plaza (San Francisco) =

Plaza in San Francisco's Civic Center

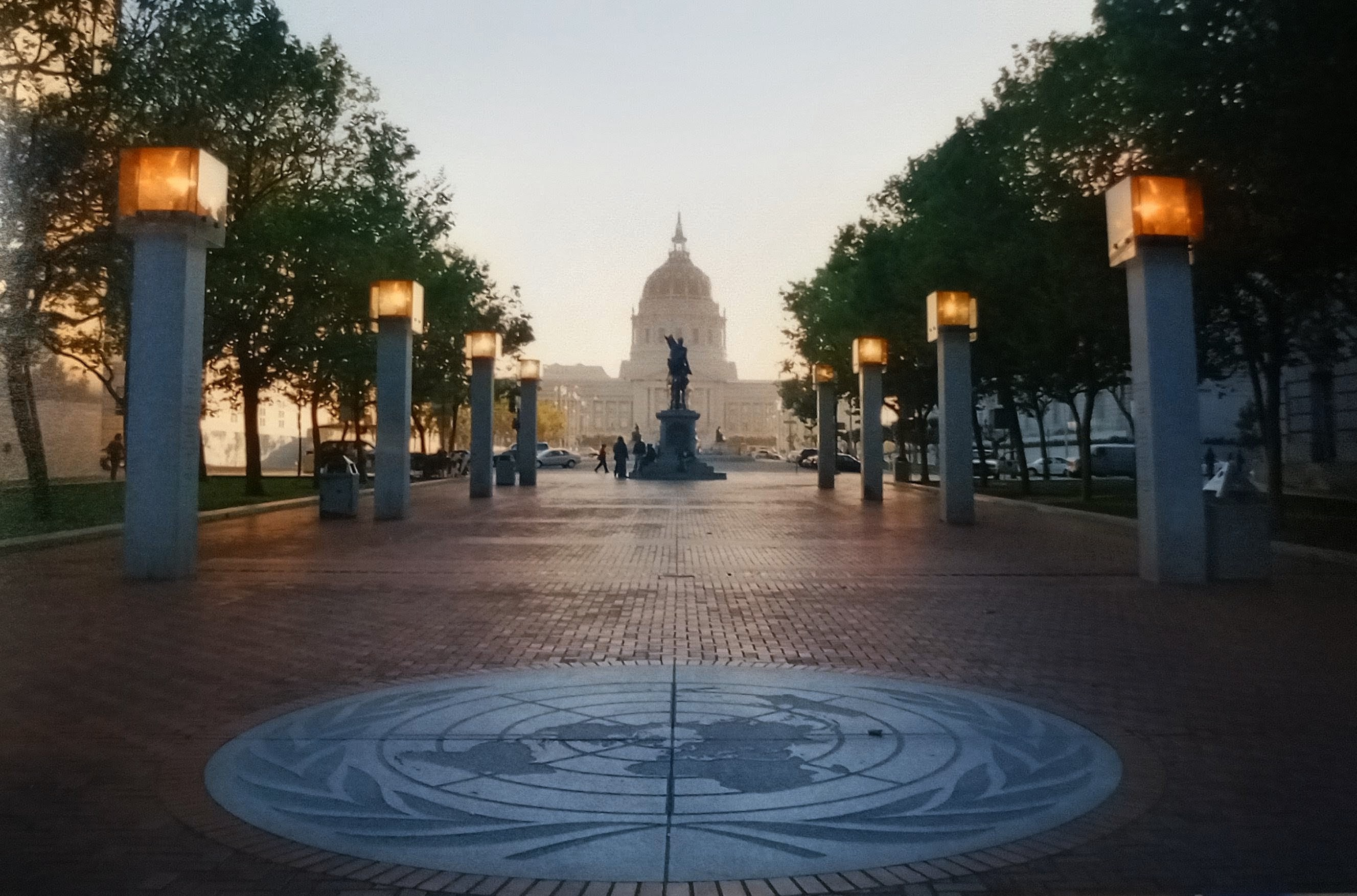
- UN Plaza features the emblem of the United Nations and a view of San Francisco City Hall, looking west (2010)

- Location within San Francisco Location within San Francisco Bay Area Location within California
- Location: Civic Center
- Nearest city: San Francisco
- Coordinates: 37°46′48″N 122°24′50″W
- Area: 2.6 acres (1.1 ha)
- Created: 1975
- Designer: John Carl Warnecke; Mario Ciampi; Lawrence Halprin
- Public transit: Muni Metro/BART (Civic Center)

United Nations Plaza (often abbreviated UN Plaza or UNP) is a 2.6-acre (1.1 ha) plaza located on the former alignments of Fulton and Leavenworth Streets—in the block bounded by Market, Hyde, McAllister, and 7th Street—in the Civic Center of San Francisco, California. It is located 1/4 mi (0.40 km) east of City Hall and is connected to it by the Fulton Mall and Civic Center Plaza. Public transit access is provided by the BART and Muni Metro stops at the Civic Center/UN Plaza station, which has a station entrance within the plaza itself.

UN Plaza was designed by a joint venture of firms led by the noted architects Lawrence Halprin, John Carl Warnecke, and Mario Ciampi; Halprin designed the large sunken fountain. The plaza was dedicated in 1975 to commemorate the formation of the United Nations and the signing of the Charter of the United Nations on 26 June 1945 in San Francisco. Since its dedication, the plaza was refurbished in 1995 and 2005, and in Spring 2018, three redesign proposals were proposed for public review.

== Location and history ==
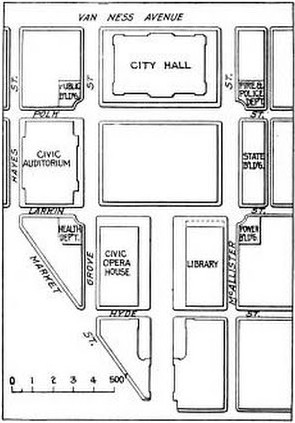
1916 map of Civic Center. Fulton Street extends east (towards the bottom of this map) from San Francisco City Hall and Civic Center Plaza, between the main library building and planned opera house.

After the 1906 San Francisco earthquake destroyed the old City Hall, the city rebuilt it and other administrative buildings as Civic Center; the key access route to the new Civic Center from Market was along the east–west Fulton Street, which lay parallel to and between McAllister and Grove. East of Van Ness, the rebuilt City Hall (1915) and Civic Center Plaza (1911) take up two city blocks each between McAllister and Grove, so the two-block eastern portion of Fulton began at the intersection with Larkin and terminated at Market. Currently, the western half of Fulton (from Larkin to Hyde) is known as Fulton Mall; the eastern half (Hyde to Market) is UN Plaza.

UN Plaza also includes a north–south segment built on the former alignment of Leavenworth, which continues north of McAllister. The Leavenworth and Fulton alignments of UN Plaza meet at a right angle; the United Nations Plaza Fountain and entrance to the transit station are where the two alignments meet.

=== Concept development ===
An east–west pedestrian mall featuring "great bands of trees, a grass mall and paved areas accented by lights and banks of flags [to] expand and extend this central park area [Civic Center Plaza] from the City Hall down Fulton Street to Market" was first proposed as part of the 1958 Civic Center Development Plan. At the time, a new long-distance subway system was being studied with an alignment along Market Street, which would eventually become the Market Street subway serving both BART and Muni Metro. In the following 1962 report What to do About Market Street, landscape architect Lawrence Halprin described his initial vision for the proposed pedestrian mall: "... when the Hyde–Larkin block [of Fulton] is reconstructed (as proposed in [the 1958 Civic Center Development Plan]), views into the Civic Center should be created. Thus our Civic Center, one of the most beautiful in America, could give tremendous support to Market Street." The proposed pedestrian mall was included in the September 1963 Downtown San Francisco plan prepared by Mario Ciampi for the Department of City Planning.

Independently, in 1965, the first concepts for the Civic Center Station Plaza were sketched out in the Market Street Design Report written by Ciampi and John Carl Warnecke. The concepts for a plaza at Seventh, either straddling Market or south of Market, would serve the future underground transit station and connect to both Fulton Mall (to the west) and the Greyhound bus terminal (to the south). Warnecke and Ciampi updated the concepts for the new plaza in the 1967 Market Street Design Plan, which called for "a major civic sculpture" to dominate "the central space and [create] the focus for the activities of the Plaza". The commission for that major civic sculpture was realized as a fountain, designed by Halprin and completed in 1975.

The architecture firm headed by Halprin joined those led by Ciampi and Warnecke in 1968 to form the Market Street Joint Venture Architects, which were responsible for the overarching Market Street Redevelopment Plan. UN Plaza was designed as part of the Market Street/Civic Center Station portion of that plan. The same architectural joint venture was also responsible for the design of the other two large plazas completed earlier along Market: Hallidie Plaza (1973) next to the Powell Street station and Embarcadero Plaza (1972) at the eastern end of Market near the Ferry Building. The Market Street Redevelopment Plan was implemented throughout the 1970s, and was substantially complete by 1979, when Joshua Friedwald documented the results for Halprin & Associates.

=== Construction ===
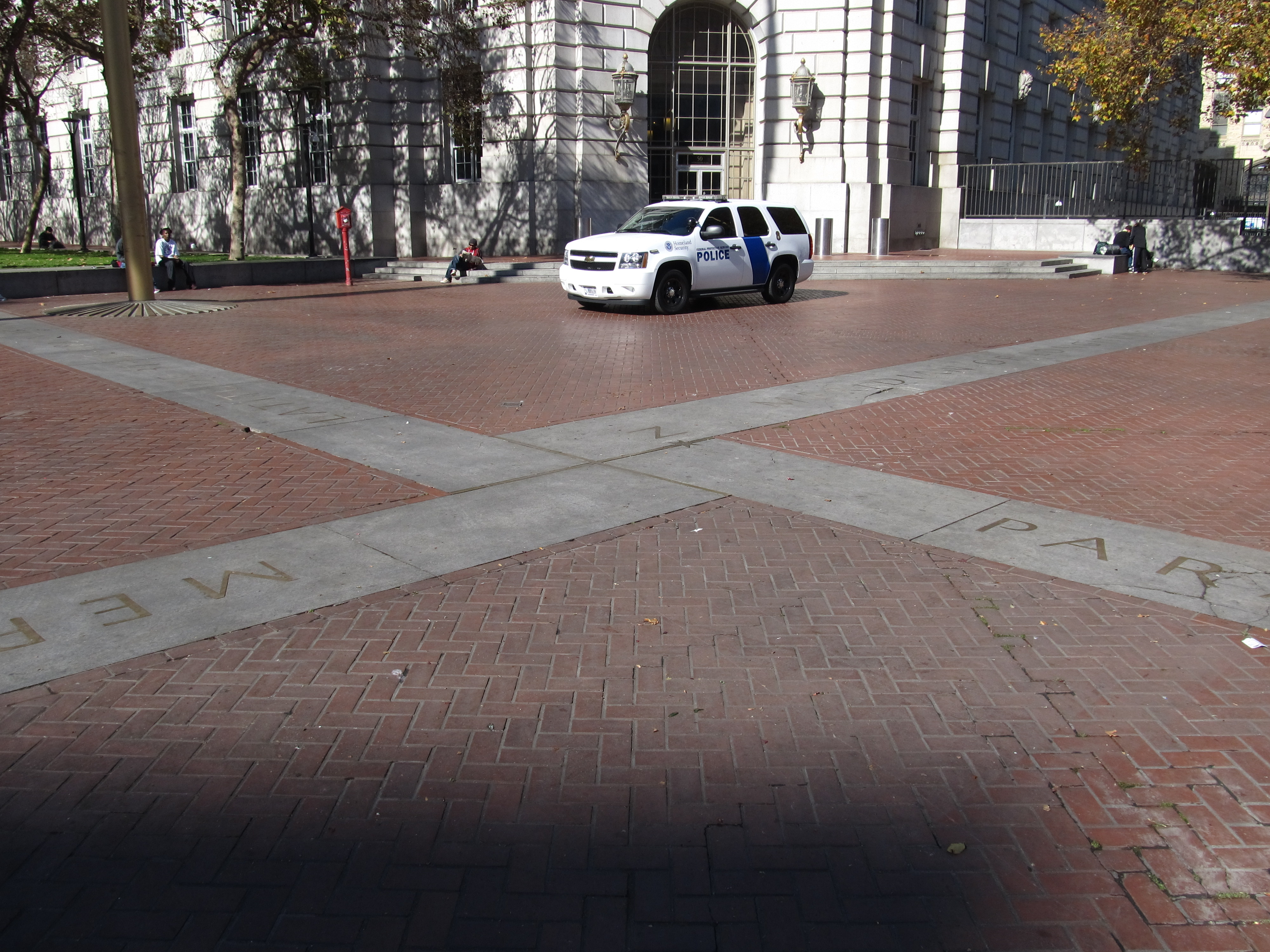
Granite latitude and longitude inlays at UN Plaza (2013)

In the original design, UN Plaza features included 117,000 ft^{2} (10,900 m^{2}) of brick paving, laid in a herringbone pattern, and 20,000 ft^{2} (1,900 m^{2}) of grass lawn. The paving in the southwest part of UN Plaza, near the border with Market Street, is interrupted by a cross formed by granite blocks inlaid with brass which indicate the coordinates of San Francisco used to measure distances to other cities. It is built on the former site of the City Hall that was destroyed in the 1906 earthquake. The pedestrian promenade along the Fulton alignment was lit with 16 light standards and featured 24 wood slat benches along the outer edges along with 192 London plane and black poplar trees. As mentioned above, the focal point was intended to be a large fountain executed in granite slabwork. The design of UN Plaza is credited to the landscape architecture firm of Halprin & Associates, with Don Carter as principal-in-charge, and Angela Danadjieva (who later served as lead designer for Freeway Park in Seattle) as the landscape architect.

Several commercial buildings were demolished to make way for the new plaza; only the Orpheum Theater (1925), 1 United Nations Plaza (1932), and the Federal Building (1936) were retained. United Nations Plaza was constructed from January to June 1975, following the reconstruction of Market Street after the cut-and-cover excavation for the Market Street subway. It was dedicated in 1975 to commemorate the formation of the United Nations and the 30th anniversary of the signing of the Charter of the United Nations on 26 June 1945 in San Francisco. Mayor Joseph Alioto dedicated the first tree on the plaza—to honor the late UN Secretary-General Dag Hammarskjöld—on June 26, 1975.

=== Refurbishment ===
==== Anniversaries of the United Nations ====
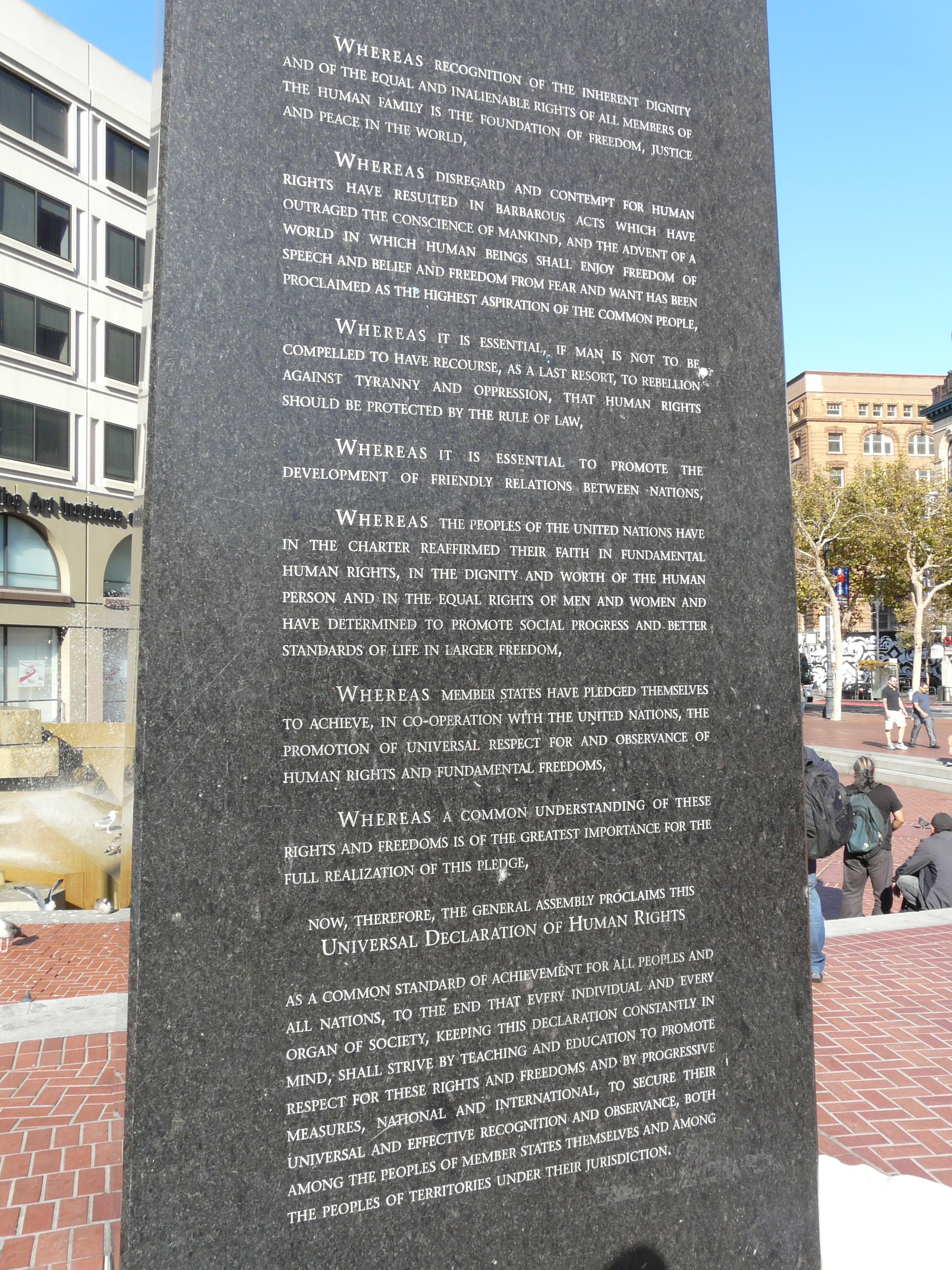
The plaza's obelisk in 2014

In 1995, for the 50th anniversary of the United Nations, a "Walk of Great Ideas", funded with private donations, was added to the plaza at a cost of US$400,000 (equivalent to $850,000 in 2025). The Walk consisted of eight white granite paving stones inlaid with the preamble to the UN Charter in brass, matching the style of the coordinates cross in the southwest part of the plaza. Additional updates in 1995 included inscribing a list of UN member nations on the light standards, adding the UN emblem to the center of the plaza, engraving the preamble to the Universal Declaration of Human Rights on an existing 17-foot (5.2 m) tall black granite obelisk, and updating the lighting fixtures. The original luminaires were semi-translucent and square, matching the shape of the columns; the updated fixtures (which remain today) are frosted glass globes.

A new round of refurbishment started in March 2005, at a cost of US$1,500,000 (equivalent to $2,500,000 in 2025), for the 60th anniversary of the UN. Planned improvements included a new stone monument to commemorate UN World Environment Day 2005, hanging the flags of all 191 member nations, and the inscription of new member nation names on the light standards. In addition, the city began to increase the number of events booked for the plaza to encourage "a healthy, vibrant environment that anybody can enjoy."

==== Civic Center Public Realm Plan ====
In 2017, the CMG Landscape Architecture firm was hired by the city planning department to redesign UN Plaza along with the adjoining Civic Center Plaza and Fulton Mall. The design goals of the subsequent Civic Center Public Realm Plan were to retain the scale but encourage pedestrian traffic. CMG unveiled three proposals in Spring 2018:

1. Civic Sanctuary, a design "that celebrates History" by evoking the Beaux-Arts spirit of the original plan.
2. Culture Connector, billed as "a vision for an inclusive commons that prioritizes Ecology, Wellness, and Variety" which includes additional trees to shade a promenade between Market Street and City Hall.
3. Public Platform, "centered on Performance" by creating flexible plazas for temporary activities.

== Current uses and events ==
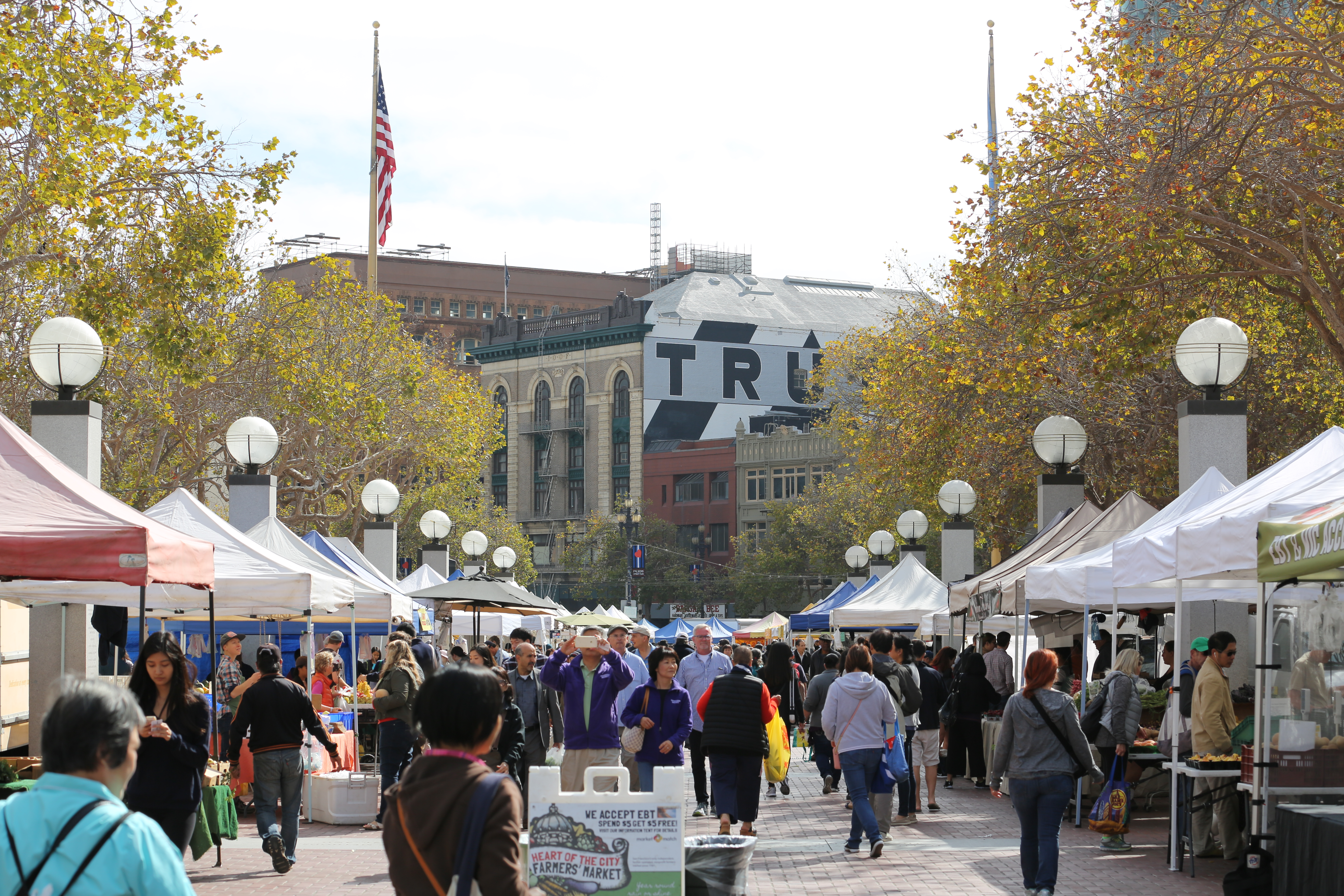
Heart-of-the-City farmer's market, view east along Fulton/UN Plaza towards Market (2016)

Rebecca Solnit, a staff writer for the San Francisco Chronicle, called UN Plaza "the spiritual and geographical heart of a considerable territory" because it was "a place where you know where you stand in the world, in the most practical and metaphysical senses" in 2004. Solnit called it a place that "just seems to encourage marching and gathering and walking", a public space that encouraged citizen participation with an active farmer's market and numerous protests near government offices.

Since 1981, the Heart-of-the-City Farmers Market has been held at UN Plaza on Wednesdays and Sundays, which alleviates the food desert that otherwise would exist in Civic Center and the South of Market neighborhoods.

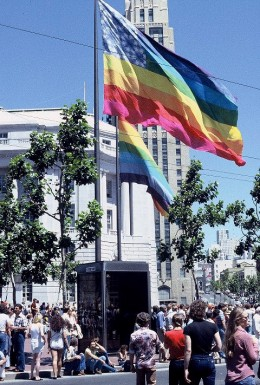
The original rainbow flag above UN Plaza for the 1978 Gay Freedom Day Parade

The homeless in San Francisco have long occupied the site, dating back to before the construction of UN Plaza. In 2001, as an attempt to combat homelessness, the city removed the plaza's benches overnight. An annual memorial, the Interfaith Homeless Persons Memorial, is held near the winter solstice, the longest night of the year, at UN Plaza to remember the homeless who have died that year. The San Francisco Police Department periodically increase patrols and enforcement in the area, and in 2018 parked a mobile command unit at UN Plaza in response to "a number of public complaints about a lot of the behaviors, the drug users, the drug dealers" according to SFPD Chief Bill Scott.

UN Plaza was designed as a pivot point for parades along Market to continue along Fulton Mall to City Hall. Gay Freedom Day Parades in 1977 (drawing 200,000) and 1978 (350,000) were established along that route and were the largest annual parades in San Francisco, which contributed to the city's reputation as a center for LGBTQ activism and culture. From 1985 to 1995, UN Plaza was the site of the AIDS/ARC (or ARC/AIDS) Vigil, the first civil disobedience protest against the AIDS epidemic; on October 27, 1985, two HIV-positive men, Steve Russell and Frank Bert, chained themselves to the doors of 50 UN Plaza, the regional office for the United States Department of Health and Human Services, to protest the government's inaction on AIDS. The round-the-clock vigil was supported by a camp of volunteers staying in UN Plaza and continued to be held there over the next ten years, until a winter storm destroyed the encampment in December 1995.

In 2023, in an effort of rehabilitation of public space, the plaza was reconfigured as a skateboarding zone.

== Fountain ==
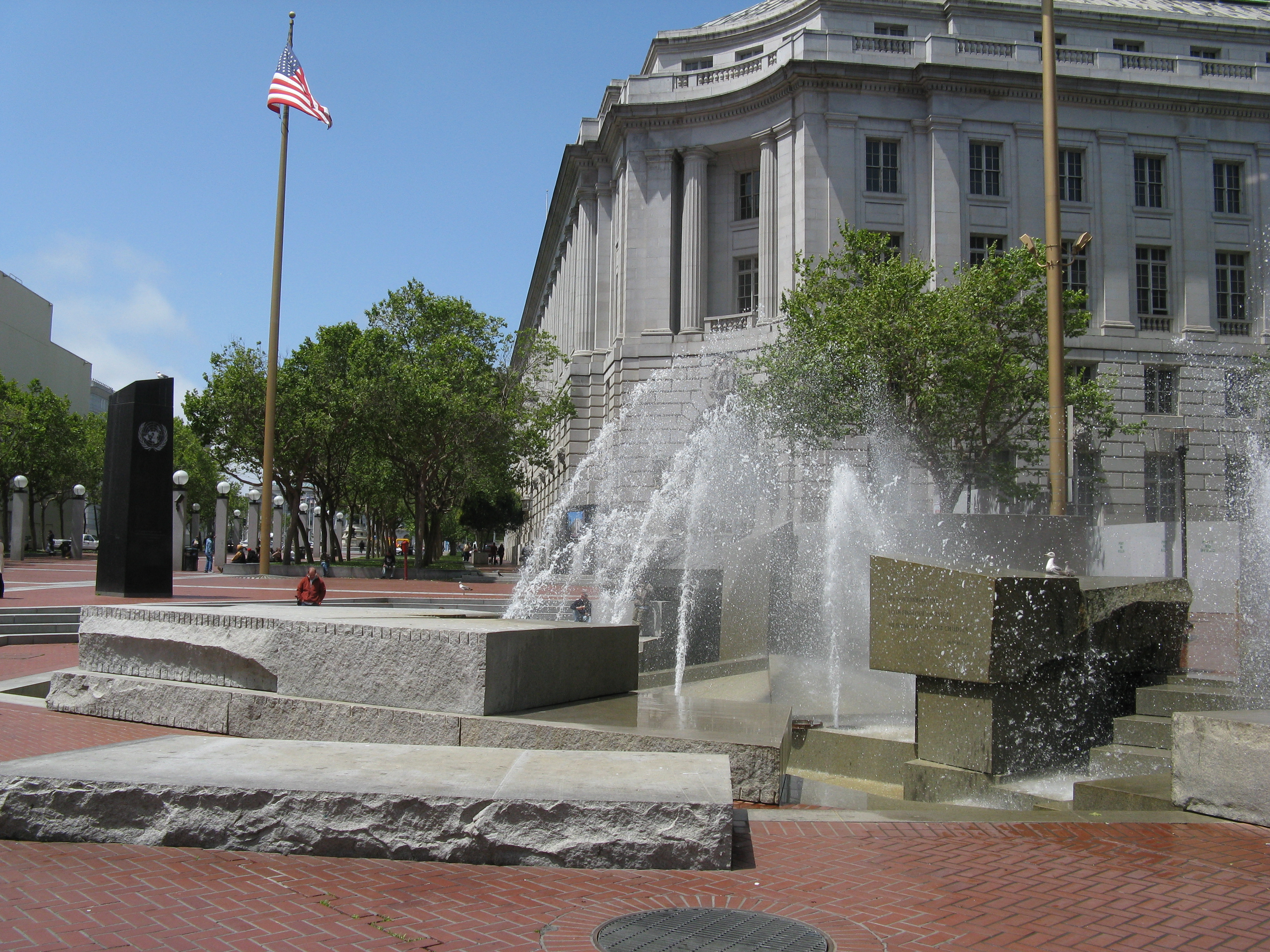
The fountain in 2011

The fountain in UN Plaza was designed by Lawrence Halprin in collaboration with Ernest Born and completed in 1975. The granite slabs are intended to symbolize the continents of Earth, and the lowest central block symbolizes a mythical lost continent. The original design called for water to flood and drain from the basin on a two-minute cycle to simulate the ocean's tides. Aerial jets make the fountain's location visible from the street, and also alert spectators to the start of a new flood/drain cycle. Computer-controlled features were intended to detect wind and attenuate pump output accordingly, to avoid splashing passers-by. The fountain never worked as designed and was fenced off as early as 1978.

Built at a cost of US$1,200,000 (equivalent to $7,180,000 in 2025), the fountain is largely sunken in the surrounding brick plaza, its basin being 100 feet (30 m) wide; and it contains 673 granite blocks over a total length of 165 feet (50 m). Several blocks are inscribed; one carries a quotation from Franklin Delano Roosevelt. According to Halprin, the fountain was meant to be "a place to walk to, sit down, do theater in"; and Halprin "claimed to be the first designer to create a space that could actually be used by people." During the design, Halprin applied a concept he dubbed "motation", meaning how an observer's perception of the environment changes depending on their speed and motion.

=== Shutoff and proposed removal ===
In 1994, the fountain at UN Plaza was proposed to be removed, as it had attracted a significant homeless population, was the site of bird droppings, public bathing, and public urination, and was called "out of scale", an assertion that was rejected by Halprin, the original designer. Because the fountain is registered with the city as part of its civic art collection, removing the fountain would require extensive reviews and public hearings. An assessment completed in 1995 concluded the fountain was not operating as designed, as only a single pump was still working to supply the jets, and the filtration was completely defunct.

Open space creates a kind of vacuum for many people. If the pumps go south and aren't repaired, the fountain goes and the place begins to seem lonely and unattractive. So they become vulnerable.

— Lawrence Halprin, The New York Times, 2003

In March 2003, the city fenced off the fountain and temporarily shut off its water to alleviate the daily burden of cleaning used needles and human feces from it. That same month, a working group commissioned by the San Francisco Board of Supervisors published a report recommending the fountain be removed. Ultimately, the Board of Supervisors rejected the 2003 proposal to remove the fountain. The renewed calls to remove the fountain were based on many of the same reasons as those from ten years prior; an article in The New York Times published in 2004 called the plaza "a public toilet, shower, washing machine, brothel, garbage can and drug market all in one".

Bollards and chains were added around the fountain during the 2005 renovation to prohibit public entry into the fountain; they have since been removed. A metal fence was erected to block off the fountain again in 2018 and replaced with a white plastic fence by April 2019; that was replaced with a high plywood fence in August in preparation for a project to convert part of the fountain's sump into a 15,000 US gal (57,000 L) storage tank for treated non-potable water that will be used to wash streets in Civic Center and the Tenderloin. A branch of the subterranean Hayes Creek had been discovered to run underneath UN Plaza during the construction of the fountain's sump; seepage had been pumped for use in street-cleaning trucks, but that source was abandoned in the 1980s.

Three proposals were advanced in 2018 to redesign the entire Civic Center area, including UN Plaza; of those three, only Civic Sanctuary calls for the restoration of the fountain at UN Plaza. Public Platform would install a new "iconic, interactive fountain" near the present site. Culture Connector would remove the water features altogether and convert the fountain into a bouldering playground. This prompted Linda Day to publish a blog with the American Society of Landscape Architects (ASLA) to protest its potential destruction. In general, the public did not support retaining the fountain; in 2011, a reader survey of Curbed SF found the United Nations Plaza Fountain was one of the least favorite public art pieces in San Francisco.

In February 2019, an updated preliminary concept largely drawn from Public Platform called for a conversion of the fountain into an "interactive fountain and garden" by partially filling it and adding plantings. A follow-up blog posted by the ASLA welcomed the retention of the fountain and the painstaking public outreach process, but expressed skepticism about when (or if) the plan would be implemented.

== Critical evaluation ==
When the fountain was unveiled, Allan Temko, the architecture critic for the San Francisco Chronicle, declared it to be "pretentious schmaltz" that "rarely work[s] and merely toss[es] around empty muscatel bottles." At the fountain's 1975 dedication, Andrew Young, United States Ambassador to the United Nations, called it "a tribute to the U.N.'s goals of seeking peaceful resolutions to international rivalries". In a 2007 retrospective, current Chronicle architecture critic John King said the "mannered drama of [Halprin's] plazas along Market Street" collectively "haven't aged well".

=== Landmark status ===
When Civic Center was nominated for inclusion on the National Register of Historic Places (NRHP), UN Plaza was noted for providing "a pedestrian approach to the Civic Center and a clear view from Market Street to City Hall." UN Plaza is eligible on its own design merits for inclusion on the NRHP, and San Francisco also considers it eligible for inclusion on the California Register of Historic Resources for its original design merits, in addition to its historic role in the LGBTQ movement as the site of parades and protests.
