= Flood Building =

James C. Flood Building
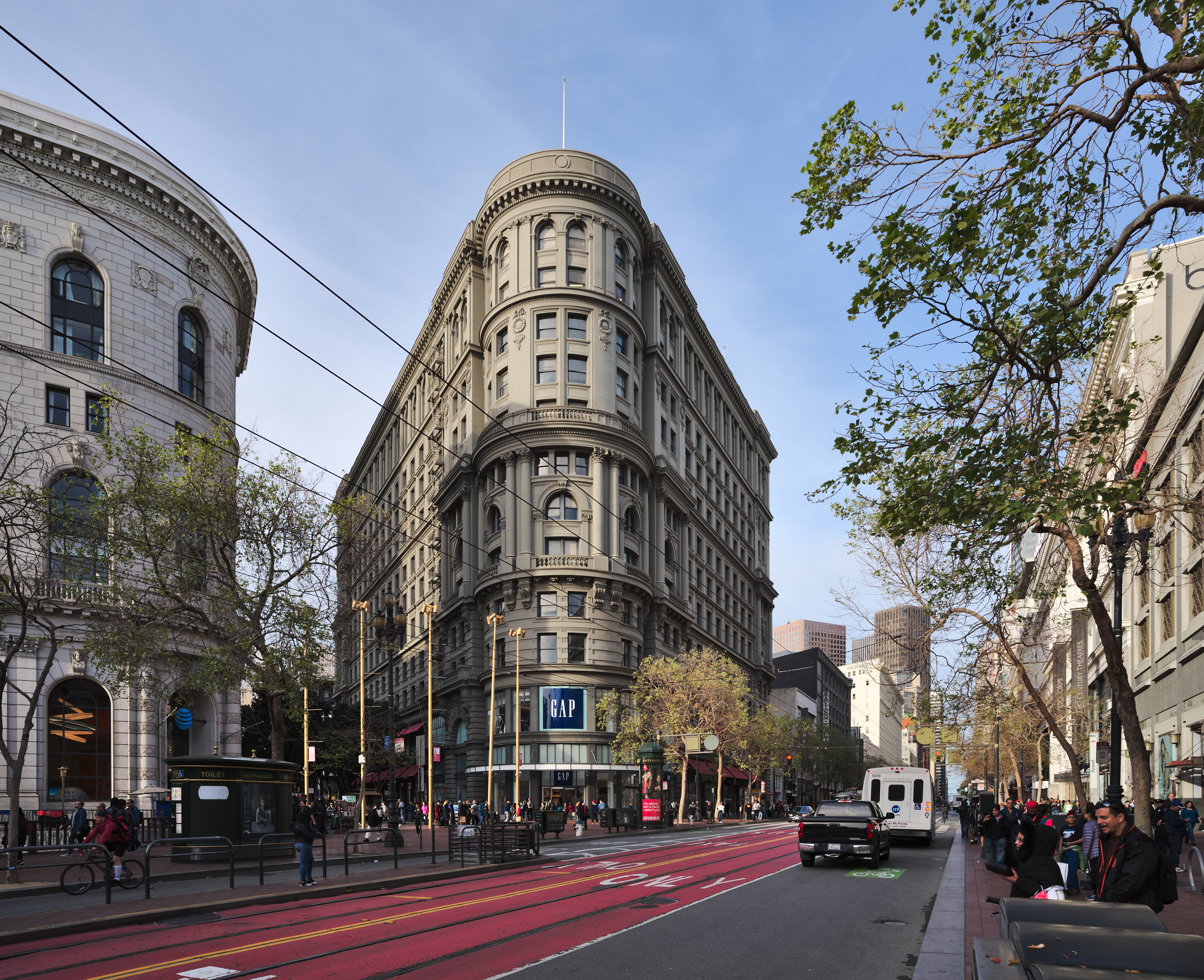
- Flood Building in 2017

- Location within San Francisco County James C. Flood Bldg. (California) James C. Flood Bldg. (the United States)
- Alternative names: James L. Flood Building; 870 Market Street

General information
- Type: Commercial offices Retail space
- Architectural style: Beaux-Arts
- Location: 870 Market Street; San Francisco, California
- Coordinates: 37.7849°N 122.4074°W
- Completed: 1904
- Cost: US$1.5 million
- Owner: The James C. Flood Family Mary E Stebbins Trust
- Management: Wilson Meany Sullivan

Technical details
- Structural system: Steel frame
- Floor count: 12
- Floor area: 293,000 sq ft (27,200 m^{2})
- Lifts/elevators: 5

Design and construction
- Architect: Albert Pissis
- Developer: James L. Flood

San Francisco Designated Landmark
- Designated: 1982
- Reference no.: 154

The Flood Building is a 12-story high-rise in the downtown shopping district of San Francisco, California. It is located at 870 Market Street on the corner of Powell Street, next to the Powell Street cable car turntable, Hallidie Plaza, and the Powell Street BART Station entrance. Designed by Albert Pissis and completed in 1904 for James L. Flood, son of millionaire James Clair Flood, it is one of the few major buildings in San Francisco that survived the 1906 earthquake and fire. As of 2024, it is still owned by the Flood family.

== Building ==
John King, the architecture critic of the San Francisco Chronicle, has described the Flood Building as "twelve stories of orderly pomp with a rounded prow that commands the corner of Powell and Market Streets ... Every detail is rooted and right, from the tall storefronts that beckon cable car daytrippers to the baroque cliff of the sandstone façade with its deep-chiseled windows." Baroque revival in style, it is a steel-frame building clad in grey Colusa sandstone. A lobby with red marble columns traverses the building from Market to Ellis Street. The wedge-shaped office floors surround a lightwell; the corridors have white marble flooring and veined white marble walls, and have retained their wooden doors with openable transom windows.

It became a San Francisco landmark in 1982.

== History ==
The site formerly housed Baldwin's Hotel and Theatre, which was destroyed by fire in 1898. It was later purchased by James L. Flood, who constructed the building as a tribute to his father, James Clair Flood, the Comstock Lode millionaire. Designed by Albert Pissis, it opened in 1904 as San Francisco's largest building. In 1906, it was one of the few major buildings to survive the San Francisco earthquake and the fire that followed; full restoration of the interior took two years.

By World War II, the building had become a medical and dental offices. In 1950, the Flood family accepted a proposal from the F. W. Woolworth Company to replace it with a modern three-story store, which would revert to the family on the expiration of a 50-year lease. Instead, after the tenants had been evicted in preparation for demolition, the building was requisitioned by the Navy for logistics purposes during the Korean War, reverting to the Flood family after the war ended in 1953. The Navy returned the retail floors to the family, and in 1952, Woolworth's opened a store in the basement and on the first and second floors, on a 40-year lease.

The building was renovated in the 1990s at a cost of $15 million, and a bust of James L. Flood by his daughter Mary Ellen Flood Stebbins was installed in the lobby.

== Tenants ==
The Southern Pacific Railroad company had its headquarters in the Flood Building from 1907 until 1917, when it relocated to its new E-shaped office building at One Market Street.

The Pinkerton Detective Agency had an office on the third floor, where it employed the novelist Dashiell Hammett as an operative; Hammett located his fictional Continental Detective Agency in the building.

Other office tenants have included the Teamsters and the Internal Revenue Service. The building formerly housed a number of consulates, including that of Mexico, until 2002. On January 27, 1975, the second anniversary of the signing of the Paris Peace Agreement ending the Vietnam War, demonstrators staged a takeover of the consulate of South Vietnam in the Flood Building. In 2003, eight consulates remained, in 2020, two, those of Nicaragua and Chile. In 2024, the Market Street Railway and Circus Bella will have their offices there.

From 1952 to 1993, the Woolworth's store at the base of the Flood Building was the largest in the chain; its size was then reduced, occupying only the basement level, and it closed in 1997. More recently, flagship stores for Gap, Urban Outfitters, and Anthropologie have been located in the building's retail space. The Gap store closed in 2020; as of July 2024, following COVID-19, Urban Outfitters is the only first-floor retail tenant, and there are a number of office vacancies.

== See also ==
- List of San Francisco Designated Landmarks
