= San Francisco City Hall =

Seat of government of San Francisco, California

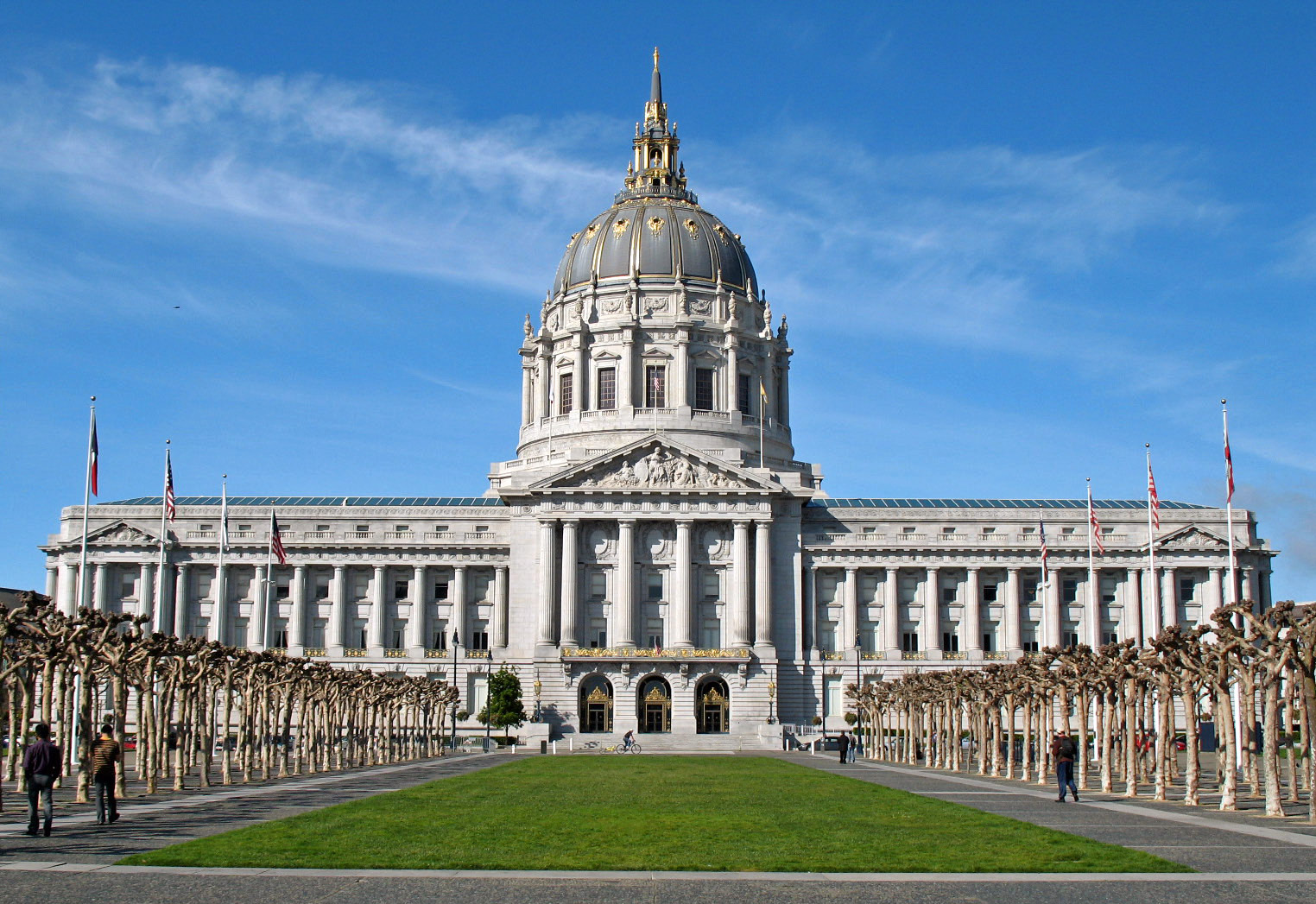
- San Francisco City Hall in 2008

- Location within San Francisco

General information
- Type: Government offices
- Architectural style: Beaux-Arts
- Location: 1 Dr. Carlton B. Goodlett Place; San Francisco, California
- Coordinates: 37°46′45″N 122°25′09″W
- Construction started: April 5, 1913; 113 years ago
- Completed: July 28, 1916; 110 years ago
- Cost: US$3.4 million ($108 million dollars in 2016)
- Owner: City and County of San Francisco
- Operator: Real Estate Division

Height
- Antenna spire: 93.73 m (307.5 ft)

Technical details
- Floor count: 5, including ground floor
- Floor area: >46,000 m^{2} (500,000 sq ft)
- Lifts/elevators: 9 (6 passenger, 3 freight)

Design and construction
- Architect: Bakewell & Brown

San Francisco Designated Landmark
- Designated: 1970
- Reference no.: 21

San Francisco City Hall is the seat of government for the City and County of San Francisco, California. Re-opened in 1915 in its open space area in the city's Civic Center, it is a Beaux-Arts monument to the City Beautiful movement that epitomized the high-minded American Renaissance of the 1880s to 1917. The structure's dome is taller than that of the United States Capitol by 42 feet (13 m). The present building replaced an earlier City Hall that was destroyed during the 1906 earthquake, which was two blocks from the present one.

The principal architect was Arthur Brown, Jr., of Bakewell & Brown, whose attention to the finishing details extended to the doorknobs and the typeface to be used in signage. Brown also designed the San Francisco War Memorial Opera House, Veterans Building, Temple Emanuel, Coit Tower and the Federal office building at 50 United Nations Plaza.

== Architecture ==
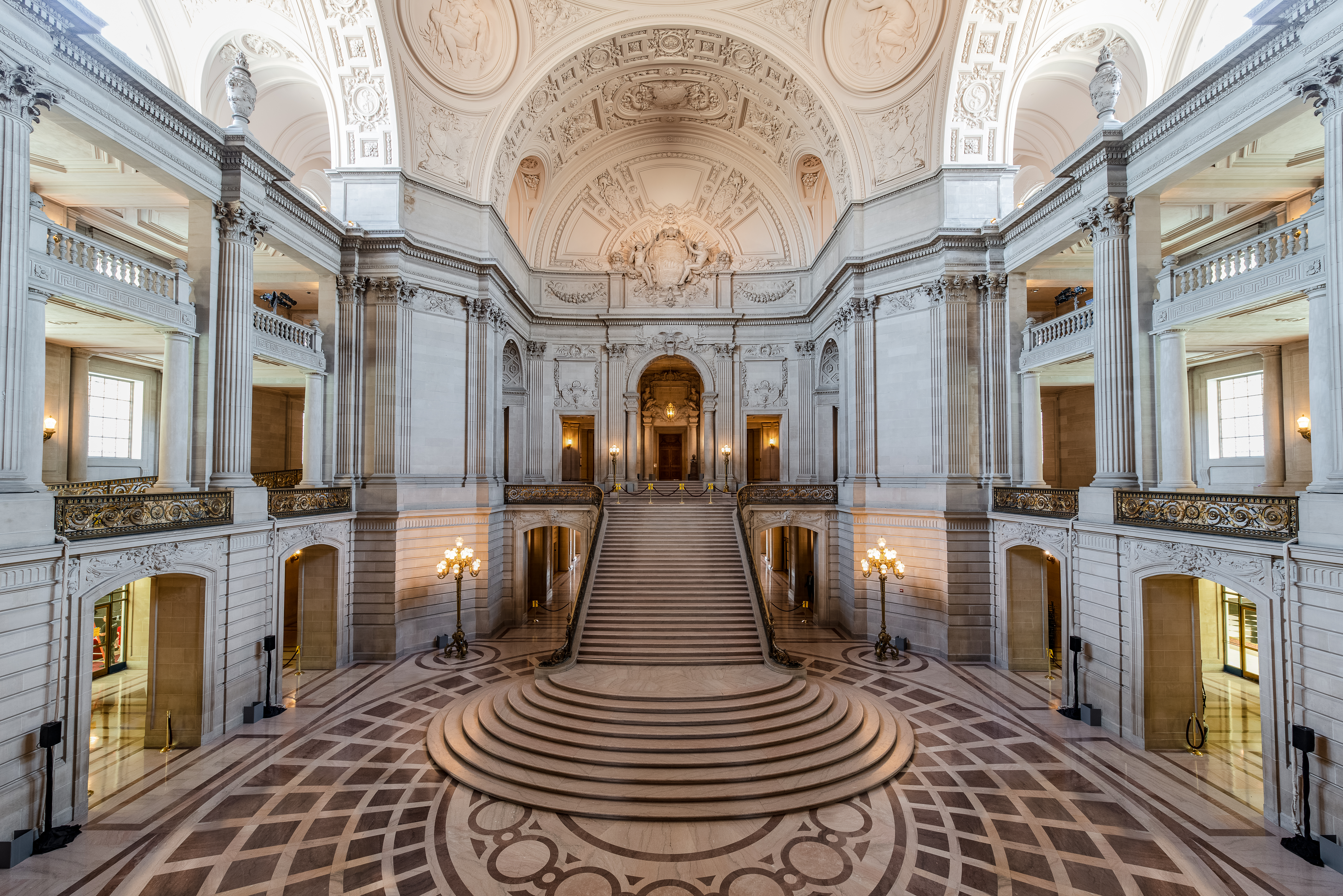
The Rotunda and grand staircase

The building's vast open space is more than 500,000 square feet (46,000 m^{2}) and occupies two full city blocks. It is 390 ft (120 m) between Van Ness Avenue and Polk Street, and 273 ft (83 m) between Grove and McAllister Streets. Its dome, which owes much to Mansart's Baroque domes of the Val-de-Grâce (church) and Les Invalides in Paris, rises 307.5 ft (93.7 m) above the Civic Center Historic District. It is 19 ft (5.8 m) higher than the United States Capitol, and has a diameter of 112 ft (34 m), resting upon 4 x 50 ton (44.5 metric ton) and 4 x 20 ton (17.8 metric ton) girders, each 9 ft (2.7 m) deep and 60 ft (18 m) long.

The building as a whole contains 7,900 tons (7,035 metric tons) of structural steel from the American Bridge Company of Ambridge, Pennsylvania near Pittsburgh. It is faced with Madera County granite on the exterior, and Indiana sandstone within, together with finish marbles from Alabama, Colorado, Vermont, and Italy. Much of the statuary is by Henri Crenier.

The upper levels of the Rotunda are public and handicapped accessible. Opposite the grand staircase, on the second floor, is the office of the Mayor. Bronze busts of former Mayor George Moscone and his successor, Dianne Feinstein, stand nearby as tacit reminders of the Moscone assassination, which took place just a few yards from that spot in the smaller rotunda of the mayor's office entrance. A bust of former county supervisor Harvey Milk, who was assassinated in the building was unveiled on May 22, 2008. The inscription that dominates the grand Rotunda and the entrance to the mayor's small rotunda, right below Father Time, reads:

SAN • FRANCISCO
O • GLORIOVS • CITY • OF • OVR
HEARTS • THAT • HAST • BEEN
TRIED • AND • NOT • FOVND
WANTING • GO • THOV • WITH
LIKE • SPIRIT • TO • MAKE
THE • FVTVRE • THINE
1912 JAMES ROLPH JR. MAYOR 1931

The words were written by the previous Mayor Edward Robeson Taylor, and dedicated by Mayor James Rolph.

While plaques at the Mall entrance memorialize President George Washington's farewell address and President Abraham Lincoln's Gettysburg Address, the primary themes of the statuary are to the past mayors, with the dates of their terms in office. The medallions in the vaults of the Rotunda are of Equality, Liberty, Strength, Learning and, as memorialized in the South Light Court display, Progress.

== History ==
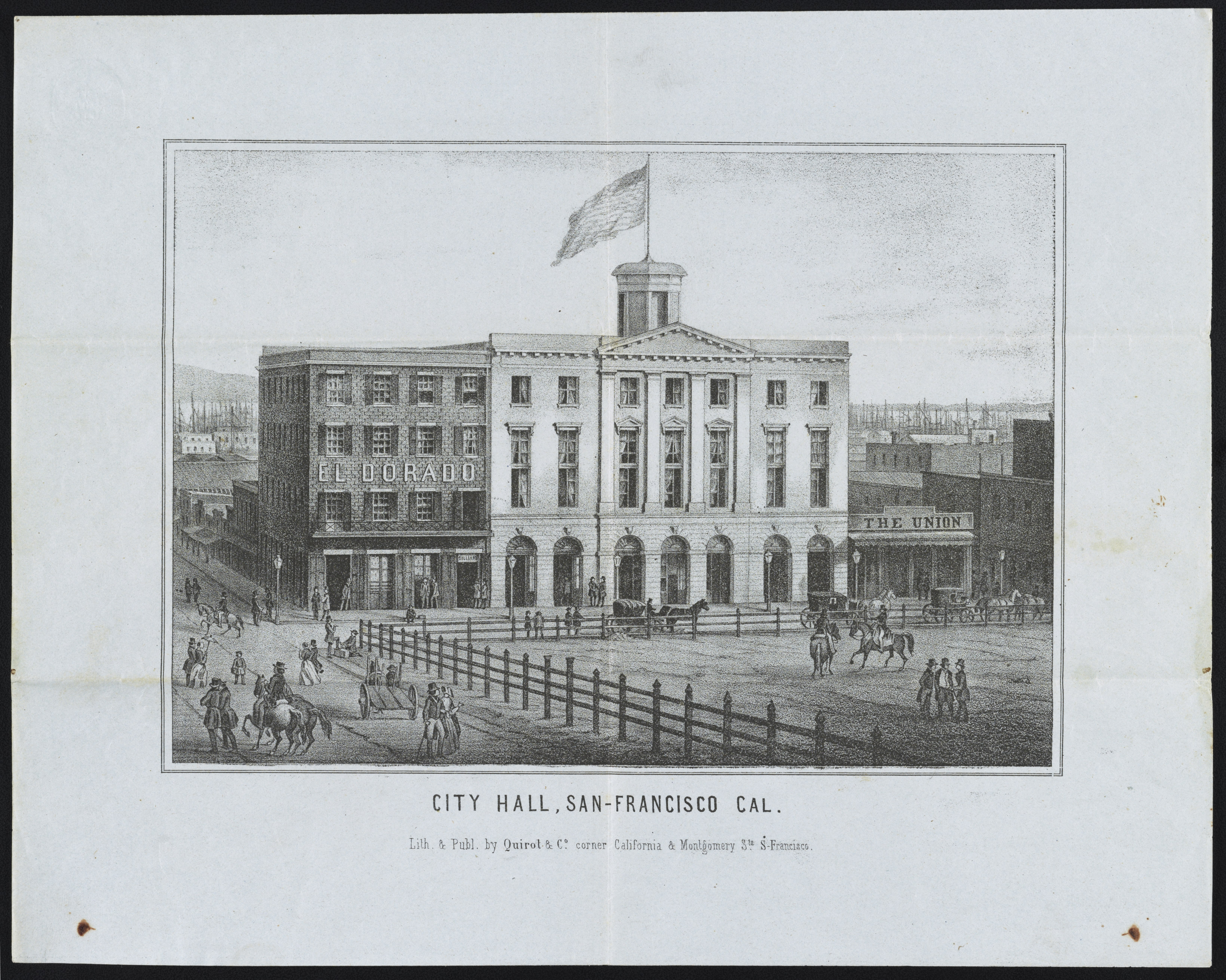
City hall, 750 Kearny Street, between Washington and Merchant streets, formerly housed the Jenny Lind Theatre

From 1849 to 1850, San Francisco's municipal government was on the west side of Portsmouth Square at the Office of the Alcalde, who was the municipal magistrate, with both judicial and administrative functions, and the ayuntamiento, the town council, or cabildo.

In May 1850, after the first City Charter was adopted, the first San Francisco City Hall was established at the former luxury hotel Graham House on the corner of Kearny and Pacific streets, which was later consumed by the great fire of June 1851. In 1852, San Francisco City Hall was at 750 Kearny Street between Washington and Merchant Streets, at the converted Jenny Lind Theatre building and Parker House, located then between the El Dorado Hotel and The Union, opposite the east side of Portsmouth Square. Later, this was the site of a Hall of Justice, as seen on the TV series, Ironside.

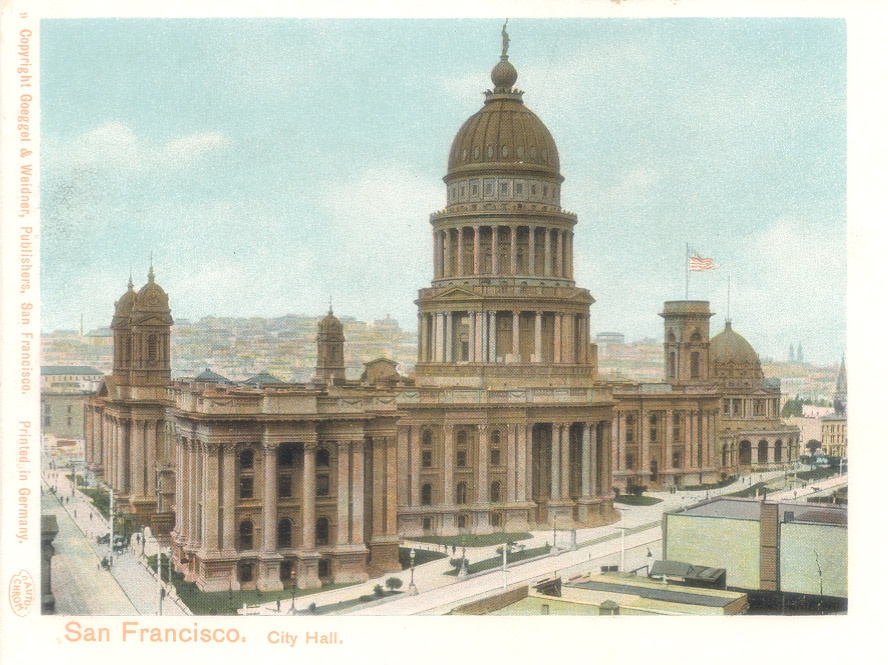
Original San Francisco City Hall, c. 1900

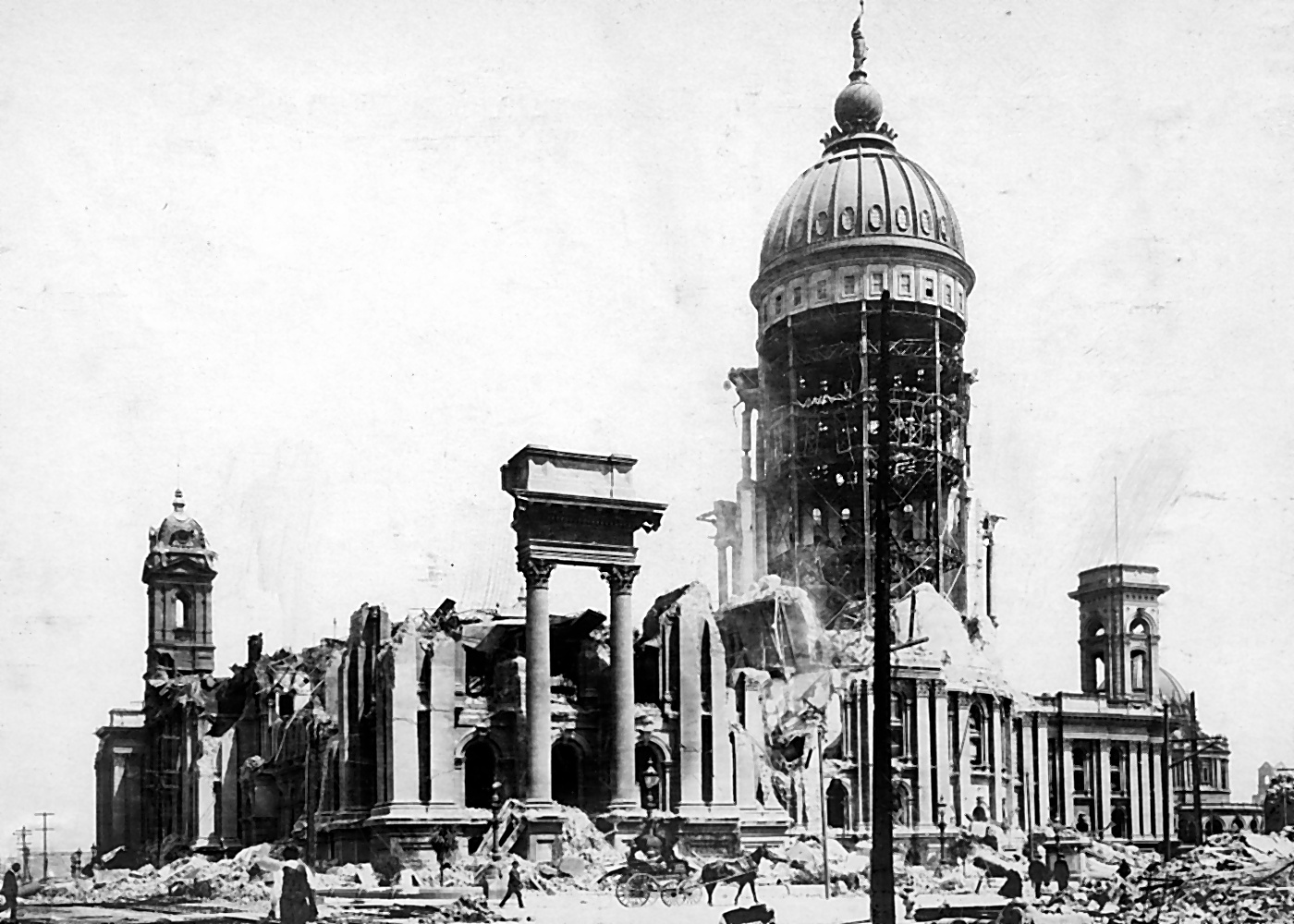
In ruins following the 1906 earthquake

The current 1916 City Hall building is a replacement for the 1899 building, construction for which began in 1871 designed by Augustus Laver and Thomas Stent.The 1899 city hall also contained a smaller extension which contained the city's Hall of Records, which housed the very first Flag of California. It was bounded by Larkin Street, McAllister Street, and City Hall Avenue (a street, now built over, which ran from the corner of Grove and Larkin to the corner of McAllister and Leavenworth), largely where the current public library and U.N. Plaza stand today. Noted city planner and architect Daniel Burnham published a plan in 1905 to redesign the city, including a new Civic Center complex around City Hall, but the plans were shelved in the wake of the 1906 San Francisco earthquake, which destroyed the 1899 City Hall.

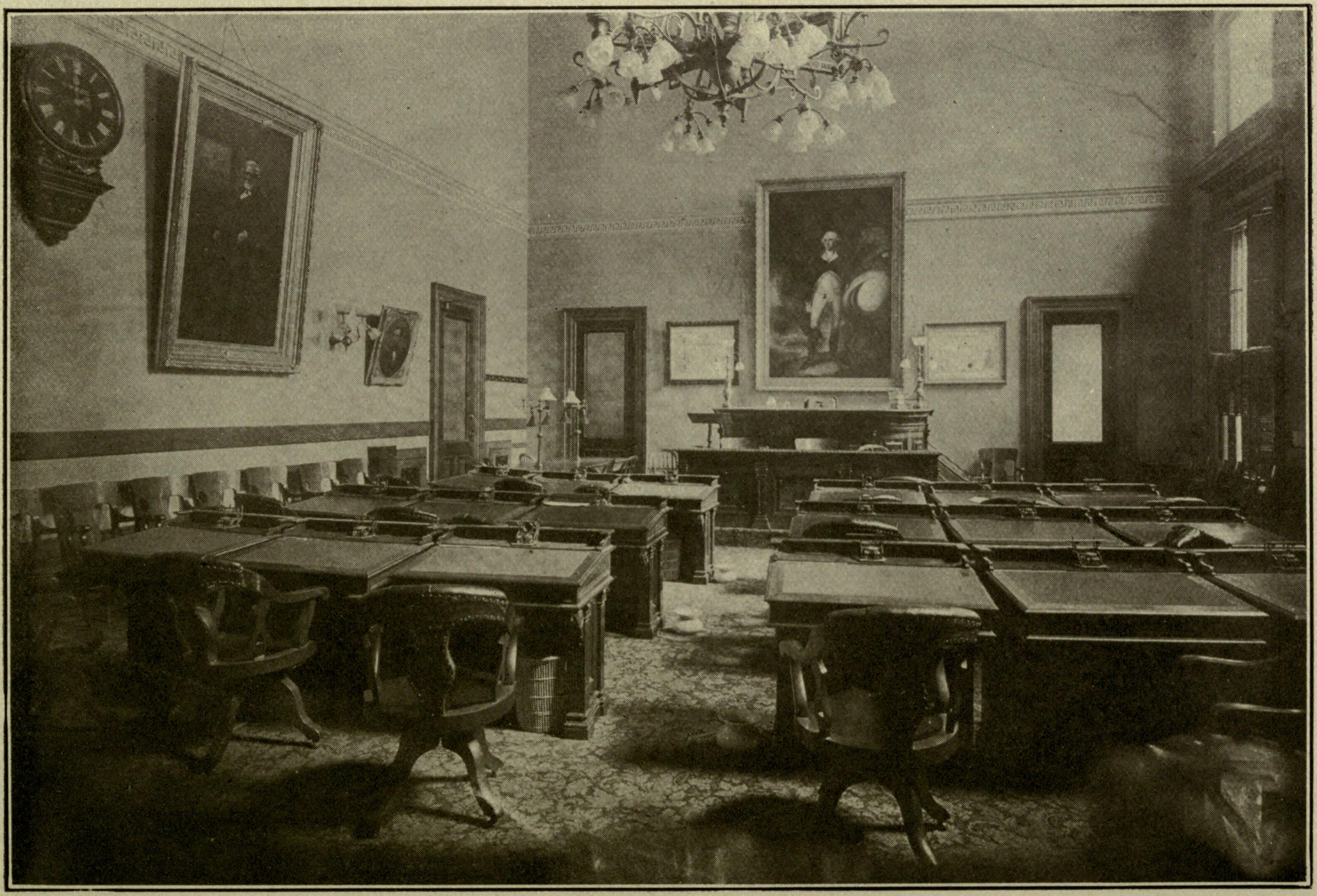
Chambers of the Board of Supervisors at City Hall before the 1906 earthquake

The 1899 building was designed as a complex of buildings to be built on a triangular park which was the former site of a cemetery. The state appropriated the land and auctioned off portions of the property. Construction began in 1870 and ended in 1897, costing six million dollars ($146,472,824.43 in 2025 dollars). Corruption was an issue during the twenty-seven years of construction that involved seven chief architects. The building's cast bricks were rumored to be shoddy, and the walls were found to be padded with sand. Fireplaces were built, and later, heating systems were installed. As a result of major sewage problems, the place was said to have a stench. The floors were misaligned, and the chimneys had draft issues.

Ever since the fire the ample ruins of the old city hall have been displayed to visitors. There is hardly a citizen that has not been embarrassed at some time or other by pertinent questions about our city hall.

— Mayor James "Sunny Jim" Rolph, 1912 San Francisco Call editorial

Reconstruction plans following the earthquake for the Civic Center complex called for a neo-classical design as part of the City Beautiful Movement, as well as a desire to rebuild the city in time for the 1915 Panama–Pacific International Exposition. A bond was authorized for $8.8 million on March 28, 1912, of which the new City Hall was budgeted for $3.5 million to $4 million. After Arthur Brown Junior's design was selected from the competition, construction started in 1913 and was completed by 1915, in time for the Exposition.

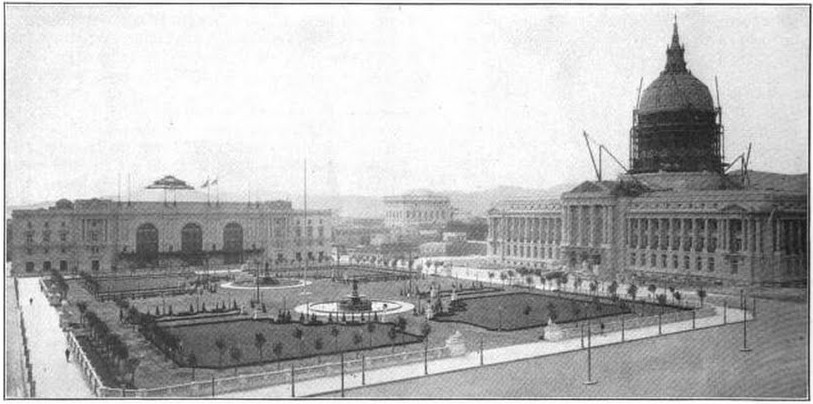
Civic Auditorium (left) and the 1916 City Hall (right) under construction (c. 1916), with Civic Center Plaza in the foreground

Ground was broken for the 1916 City Hall at Van Ness and Fulton on April 5, 1913, and the cornerstone was laid on October 25 of that year. Mayor Rolph moved into City Hall on December 28, 1915, the final stone was laid on March 31, 1916, and scaffolding was finally removed on July 28, officially marking the end of construction. The ruins of the old City Hall were sold shortly thereafter in August 1916 for US$2,300 (equivalent to $68,000 in 2025), with removal to be completed within 40 days.

The main rotunda served as the site where many prominent politicians and public servants were laid in state. General Fredrick Funston, hero of the Spanish–American War, Philippine–American War, and the 1906 earthquake laid there in 1917. President Warren G. Harding laid here in 1923. Former mayor and governor James Rolph was laid in state in City Hall following his death in 1934.

Joe DiMaggio and Marilyn Monroe were married at City Hall in January 1954.

In May 1960, the main Rotunda was a site of a student protest against the House Un-American Activities Committee and a countering police action whereby students from UC Berkeley, Stanford, and other local colleges were fire hosed down the steps beneath the rotunda. This event was memorialized by students during the Free Speech Movement at UC Berkeley four years later.

On November 27, 1978, former Supervisor Dan White assassinated Mayor George Moscone and Supervisor Harvey Milk inside of City Hall.

The Loma Prieta earthquake of 1989 damaged the structure, and twisted the dome four inches (102 mm) on its base. Afterward, under the leadership of the San Francisco Bureau of Architecture in collaboration with Carey & Co. preservation architects, and Forell/Elsesser Engineers, work was completed to render the building earthquake resistant through a base isolation system, (Note: In an earthquake, the mass of the dome threatens to act as a pendulum, rocking the building's structure and tearing it apart, but the base isolation system of hundreds of rubber and stainless-steel insulators inserted into City Hall's underpinnings should have the effect of disrupting seismic waves before they can affect the structure.) which would likely prevent total collapse of the building. City Hall reopened after its seismic upgrade in January 1999, and was the world's largest base-isolated structure at that time.

Prior to the retrofitting, the San Francisco County Superior Court’s civil courtrooms were located in City Hall but have been located across the street at the 400 McAllister courthouse since it opened in 1997.

The original grand plaza has undergone several extensive renovations, with radical changes in its appearance and utility. Prior to the 1960s there were extensive brick plazas, few trees, and a few large, simple, raised, and circular ponds with central fountains, all in a style that discouraged loitering. The plaza was then extensively excavated for underground parking. At this time a central rectangular pond, with an extensive array of water vents (strangely, all in several strict rows and all pointing east, with identical arcs of water, and completely without sculptural embellishment), was added, with extensive groves of trees (again, in 60s modernist style, planted with absolute military precision on rectangular grids). In the 1990s, with the rise of the problem of homelessness, the plaza was once again remodeled to make it somewhat less habitable—although the most significant change, the replacement of the pond and pumps with a lawn, could be reasonably justified on the basis of energy and water conservation.

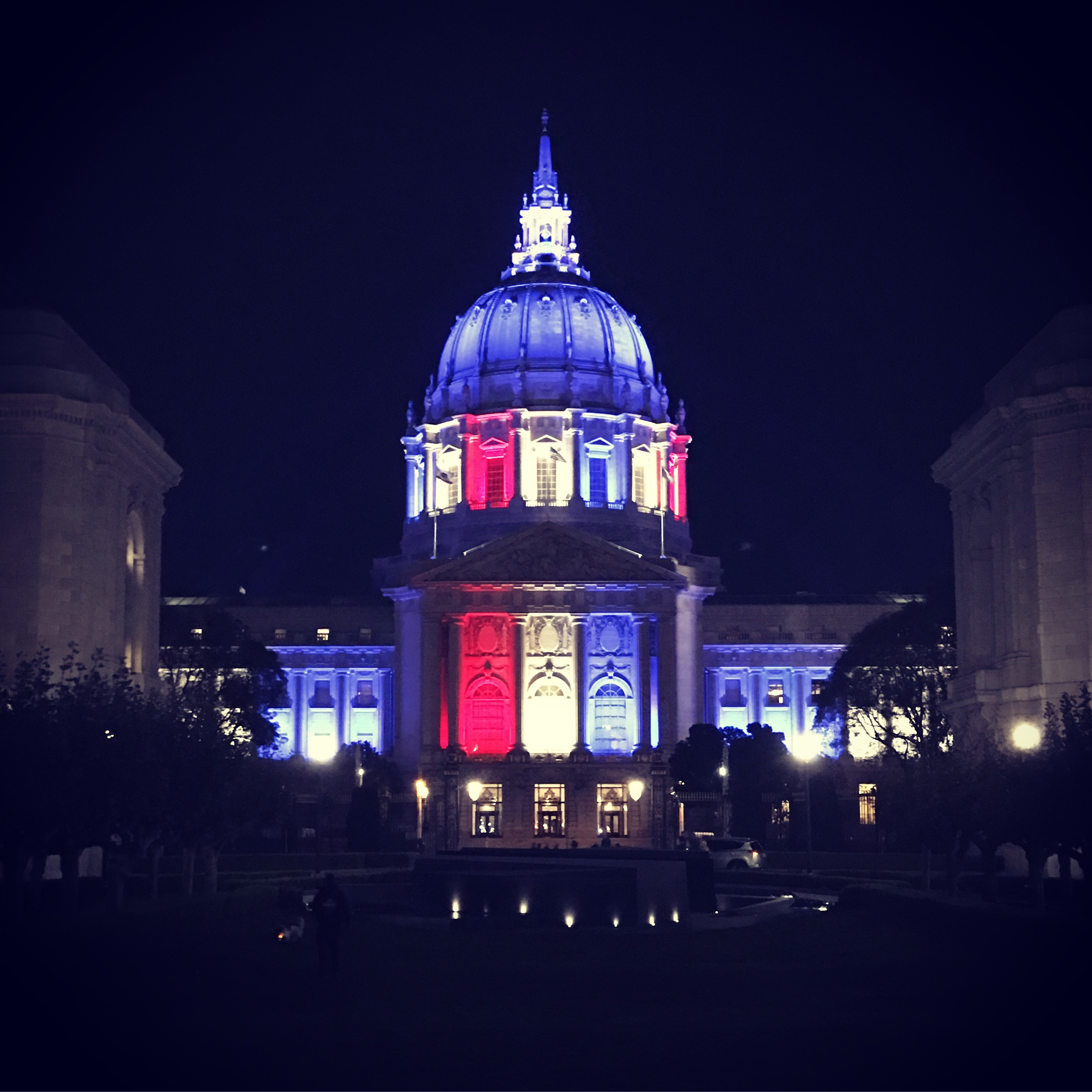
San Francisco City Hall with red, white and blue lights on 2018 Election Day

The building features color changeable LED lighting at the outside of the Rotunda, and between the exterior columns. The colors change to coincide with different events happening in the city and elsewhere.

During the COVID-19 pandemic, City Hall was closed from March 2020 until reopening on June 7, 2021.

== In popular culture ==
- Dirty Harry (1971) filmed several scenes at City Hall, including inside the Mayor's office.
- The Towering Inferno (1974)
- Invasion of the Body Snatchers (1978)
- Foul Play (1978)
- A View to a Kill (1985)
- The Grand Staircase is featured in the Raiders of the Lost Ark (1981) as a stand-in for an unnamed government building in Washington, D.C.
- Ten-thousand-watt spotlights triggered the fire sprinkler system during the filming of Bicentennial Man (1999), resulting in water damage. The crew previously shot in the Supervisors' chambers.
- Milk (2008)
- The Man in the High Castle (TV series) (2015)
- The Etruscan Smile (2018)

== See also ==
- List of San Francisco Designated Landmarks
- List of tallest buildings in San Francisco
- List of tallest domes
- San Francisco Board of Supervisors
