= Albert Pissis =

Mexican-American architect

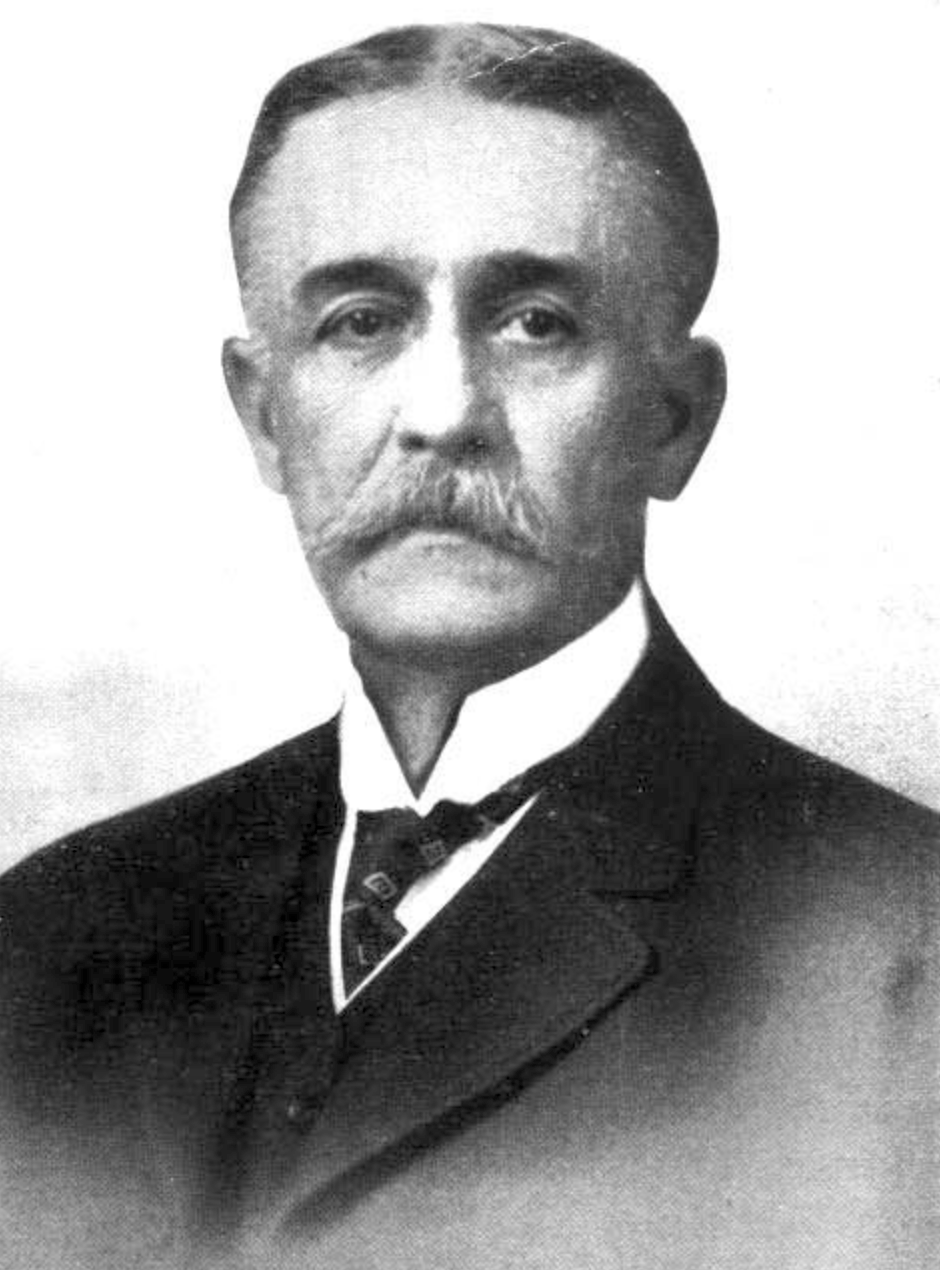
- Born: Albert Pissis; April 26, 1852; Guaymas, Sonora, Mexico
- Died: July 5, 1914 (aged 62); San Francisco, California, U.S.
- Education: École des Beaux-Arts
- Occupation: Architect
- Known for: introducing the Beaux-Arts architectural style to San Francisco, California

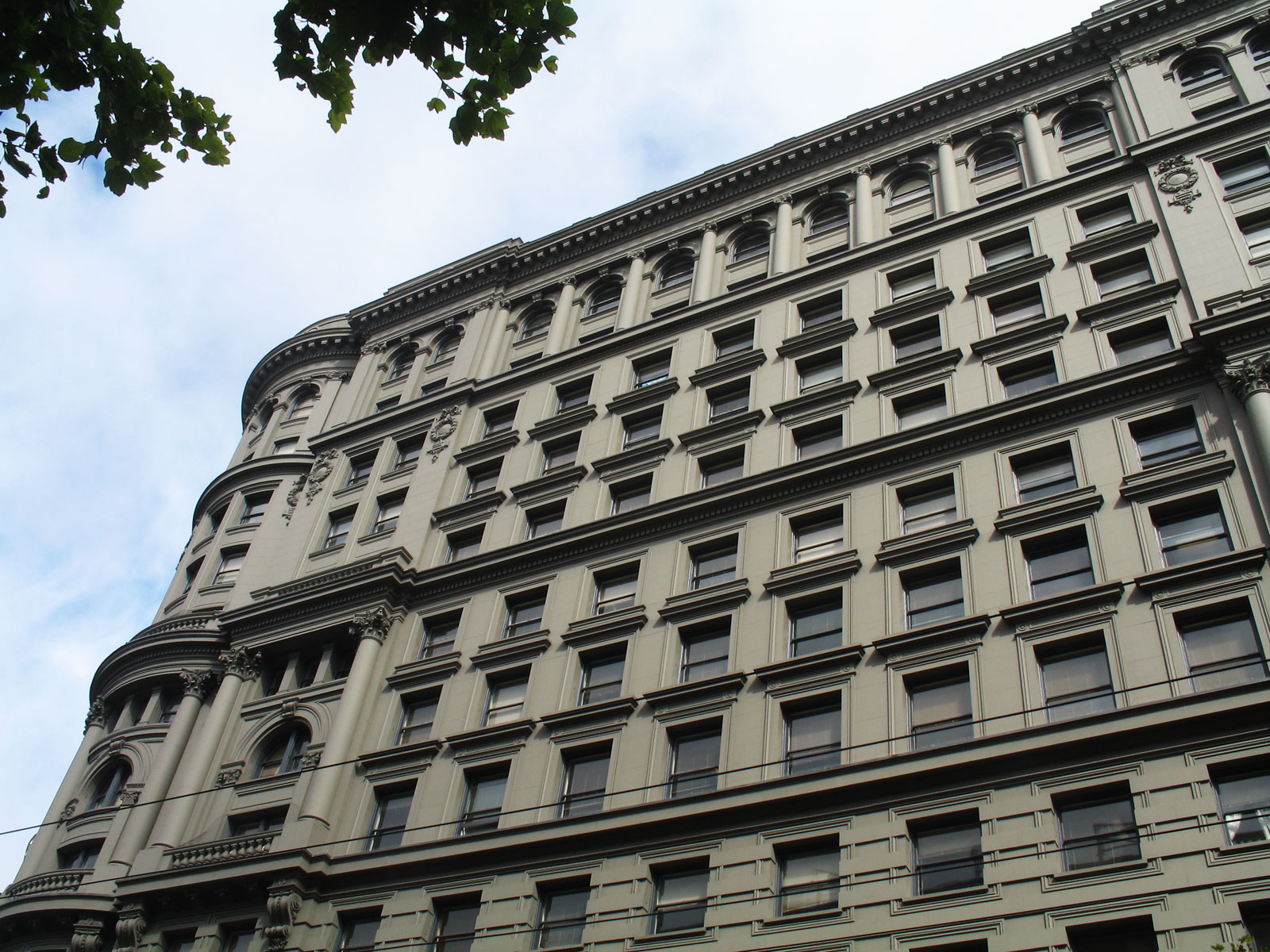
James Flood Building, San Francisco

Albert Pissis (1852–1914) was a prolific Mexican-born American architect, of French and Mexican descent. He was active in San Francisco and had studied at the École des Beaux-Arts in Paris, France. He is credited with introducing the Beaux-Arts architectural style to San Francisco, California, designing a number of important buildings in the city in the years before and after the 1906 San Francisco earthquake.

== Early life and education ==
Pissis was born on April 26, 1852, in Guaymas in the Mexican state of Sonora. His father was Jose Etienne Pissis (1808–1880), a native of France and a physician, who moved his family to San Francisco, California from Guaymas when Pissis was six. His mother was Juana Bazozabel "Jane" de Bustamante (1824–1893), a native of Guaymas.

Pissis was one of the first Americans to study at the École des Beaux-Arts in Paris, France. He returned in 1880 to San Francisco, which at the time was a fairly provincial Western town despite its wealth, with buildings designed in a variety of architectural styles.

== Career ==
In 1882, Pissis became a member of the American Institute of Architects (AIA) and, with his partner William P. Moore, designed a number of buildings in flamboyant Queen Anne and Eastlake styles. However, by the 1890s he was a major figure in the Neoclassical (Classical Revival) movement, particularly Beaux-Arts, and introduced that style to San Francisco beginning with the Hibernia Bank building in 1892. Initially considered revolutionary, the style became popular among the city's powerful commercial and banking concerns. The dome he designed for the Emporium Department Store, now part of the Westfield San Francisco Centre, is often considered a "masterpiece".

Pissis played a major role in San Francisco's reconstruction following the Great Earthquake of 1906, both as a designer of a number of the city's landmark buildings, and as a member of the Committee of Fifty. He was also President of the local AIA chapter from 1907 to 1908.

Although popular and internationally known at the time, Pissis's approach to design was derided by later critics as reactionary, and blamed for suppressing more original architects such as Frank Lloyd Wright and Louis Sullivan in favor of imitation of older European traditions. However, in more recent years his buildings have been increasingly praised.

Pissis died on July 5, 1914, of pneumonia at age 62, in his suite at the St. Francis Hotel. He was survived by his widow, Georgia, who in 1920 sold land to Redwood City, California, that became Sequoia High School.

== Notable works ==
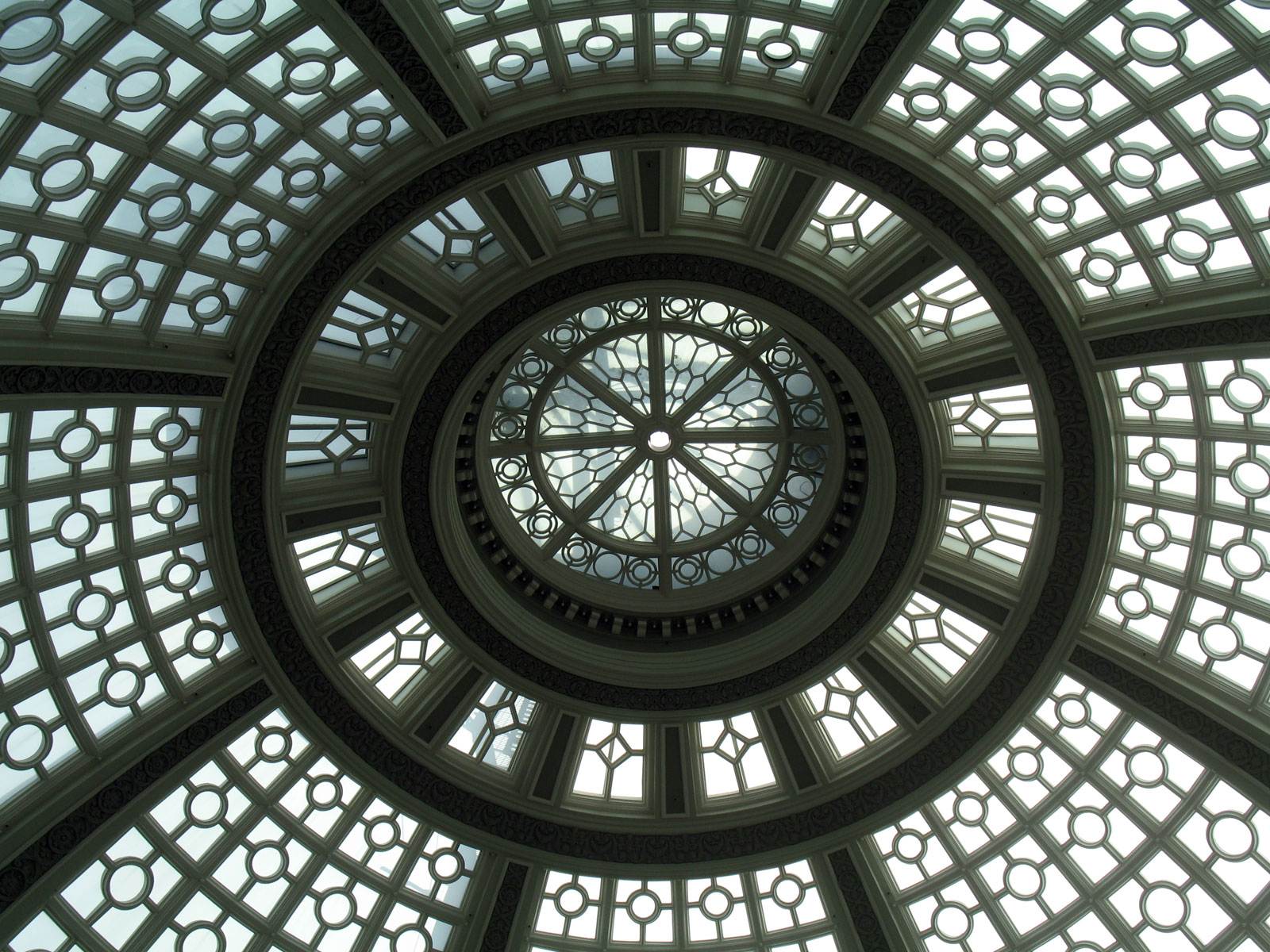
The Emporium dome on Market Street in San Francisco, California

Among the buildings Pissis designed are:

- Hotel Cecil (1906), 156–160 Eddy Street, San Francisco, California; part of the Uptown Tenderloin Historic District
- Hibernia Bank building (1892), McAllister and Jones Streets, San Francisco, California
- The Emporium, Market Street, San Francisco, California; formerly the "Parrott Building," former home of the California Supreme Court, now part of the Westfield San Francisco Centre.
- James Flood Building, Market and Powell Street, San Francisco, California.
- The White House department store, Grant Avenue and Sutter Street, San Francisco, California; now Banana Republic store and White House Garage
- Temple Sherith Israel, 2266 California Street, Pacific Heights, San Francisco, California
- Mechanics' Institute Library, 57 Post Street, San Francisco, California
- University House (1911), Oxford Street, Berkeley, California; NRHP-listed and Berkeley Landmark-listed
- Old Bank of Eureka Building (1911), 240 East Street, Eureka, California; NRHP-listed
