= Fox Plaza =

Fox Plaza may refer to:

- Fox Plaza, Los Angeles
- Fox Plaza, San Francisco
