= Brooks Hall =

Disused event venue in San Francisco, California

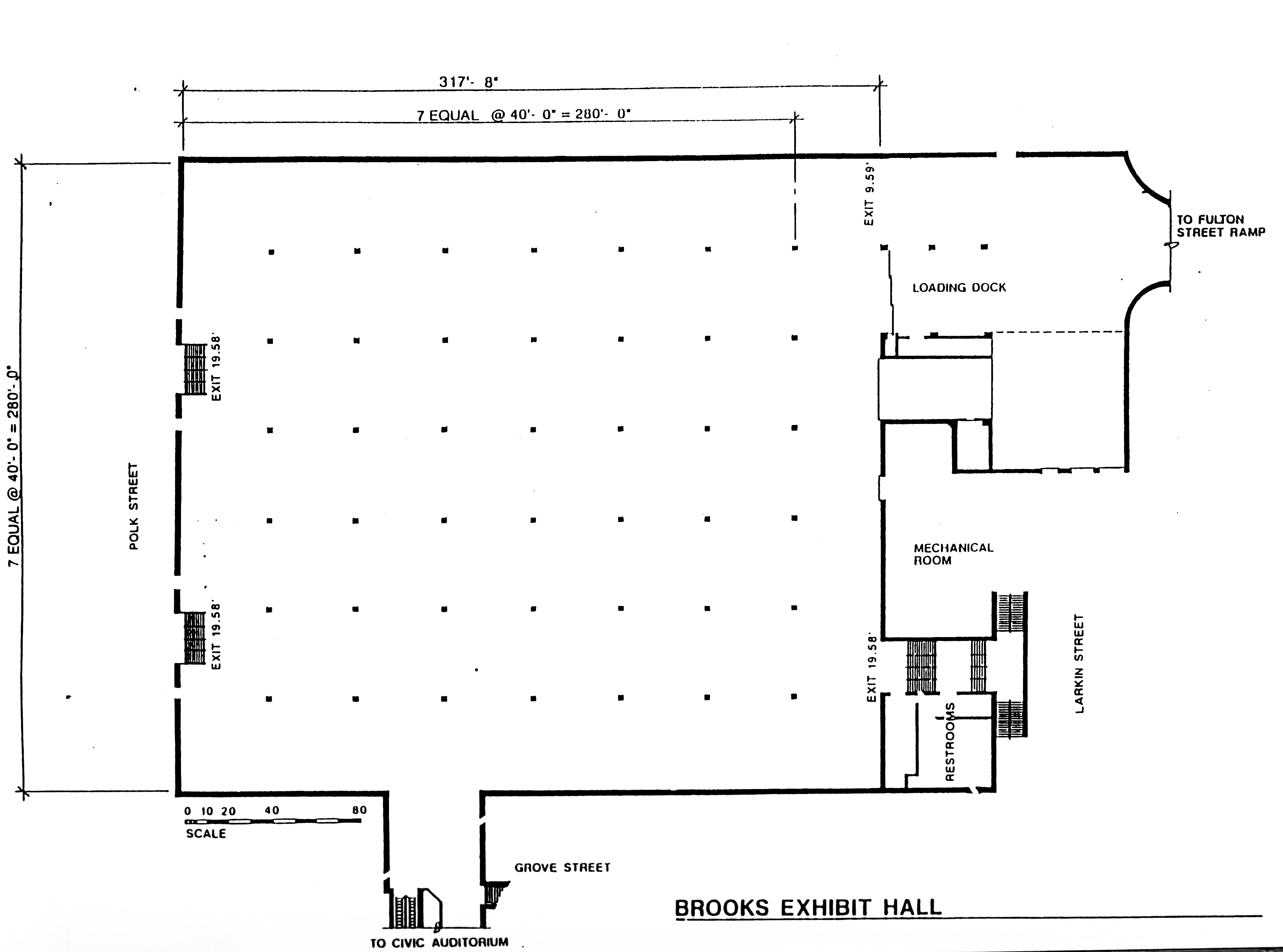
- Site plan of Brooks Hall, San Francisco (published in 2000)
- Interactive map of Brooks Hall
- Former names: Civic Center Event Hall; Mole Hall; Gopher Palace
- Coordinates: 37.778951°N 122.417502°W
- Owner: City and County of San Francisco
- Public transit: BART and Muni, UN Plaza station

Construction
- Built: 1956–58
- Opened: 1958
- Closed: 1993
- Cost: US$4,500,000 (equivalent to $50,220,000 in 2025)

Brooks Hall (originally Civic Center Exhibit Hall, nicknamed Mole Hall and Gopher Palace) is a disused 90,000 ft^{2} (8,400 m^{2}) event space underneath the southern half of Civic Center Plaza in San Francisco; a parking garage occupies the space under the northern half.

It was built in the late 1950s for $4,500,000, and dedicated on April 11, 1958. It was named after Thomas A. Brooks, a chief administrative officer of the City and County of San Francisco, who retired the same year the building was dedicated.

== Design and construction ==
The concept of an exhibition space under Civic Center Plaza was advanced in a 1953 report written by city planners which called for the first reinvention of the Civic Center since the original 1911 design and also predicted what would become Moscone Center. Funding for the project was provided largely through $3M authorized by Measure A, passed by San Francisco voters in November 1954, and planning for the new space began in 1956.

Excavation for the site began on September 17, 1956, and citizens were encouraged to take plants from Civic Center Plaza for their personal use. The discovery of prior paving and building foundations on the site slowed construction, which had been scheduled to take 18 months after excavation was to be completed in February 1957, and Mayor George Christopher presided over the dedication ceremony on April 11, 1958, when the exhibition space was dedicated for Brooks. During construction, the local press dubbed the new space "Mole Hall" or "Gopher Palace", nicknames that profoundly irritated Mayor Christopher and which made headlines from coast to coast. The three-story subterranean parking garage immediately north of Brooks Hall was built starting in 1959; the two structures are separated with a seismic joint 4 1/2 inches (110 mm) wide and a tunnel connects the two structures.

Brooks Hall was built with a tunnel underneath Grove Street, connecting the exhibition space to its neighbor to the south, Bill Graham Civic Auditorium. Drainage was one of the major challenges in building the underground space; at the time of construction, the water table was only 16 to 19 feet (4.9 to 5.8 m) below the Civic Center Plaza surface, and the excavation for Brooks Hall went to a depth exceeding 30 feet (9.1 m). To keep the site dry, five wells were drilled 50 feet (15 m) deep along the north and west edges of the site and water was continuously pumped out of the site at a rate of 100 to 300 US gal/min (6.3 to 18.9 L/s) per well.

The foundation consists of a large, 3 1/2 ft (1.1 m) thick concrete slab measuring 287 by 374 feet (87 m × 114 m) floating on fill and sand. The overall dimensions of Brooks Hall itself are 284 by 434 feet (87 m × 132 m) including mechanical spaces and offices, and overall height is 21 ft 6 in (6.55 m), measured floor-to-floor. Inside, the ceiling has a vertical clearance of 14 feet (4.3 m) to the floor; square concrete pillars measuring 32 in (810 mm) on a side are spaced on 40-foot (12 m) centers to support the space. Forced air ventilation is provided; air may be heated (using steam from city plants) or chilled (using a chilled water system); aboveground, the ventilation structures near one playground are the most visible sign of Brooks Hall. The roof of Brooks Hall is covered with soil varying between 3 and 5 feet (0.91 and 1.52 m) deep. A report published in 1998 estimated the weight of Brooks Hall alone may not be sufficient to resist the buoyant uplift without the soil covering. The prime contractor for Brooks Hall was Theo G. Meyer & Sons; the architects were Wurster, Bernardi & Emmons collaborating with Skidmore, Owings & Merrill; engineering was provided by H.J. Brunnier and DeLeuw, Cather & Co.

== History ==
At the opening ceremony, Mayor Christopher bragged that the site had already been booked for 74 days in 1958, 104 days in 1959, and 117 days in 1960. However, just six months after opening, Saul Poliak, an innovator in industry trade shows, called Brooks Hall "distressingly inadequate" and had left "San Francisco unprepared for major conventions and exhibitions" while providing some faint comparative praise: "Your chief competitor out here is Los Angeles, of course, and right now they’re in worse shape than you are."

=== Notable exhibitions ===
One of the first shows booked at the new exhibition space was the 1958 American Medical Association convention. For that show, Wallace Laboratories had commissioned artist Salvador Dalí for an eye-catching piece to promote its new tranquilizer, Miltown. The result, Crisalida, a 60-foot (18 m) long walk-through cocoon-shaped gallery made from parachute silk intended to display the journey from anxiety to calm, made headlines nationally, including coverage in Time.

During its operating history, Brooks Hall became home to events such as the Harvest Festival, the San Francisco Gift Show, and the West Coast Computer Faire, credited as the first microcomputer convention, which drew 12,700 visitors its first year (1977). It was also where Apple hosted the first Macworld convention in 1985, and many subsequent ones.

Contrary to popular belief, the 1968 Mother of All Demos was not held at Brooks Hall, but in the nearby Civic Auditorium.

=== Decline and closure ===
By October 1958, the original architect/engineer design team had prepared plans to expand the facilities at Brooks Hall with an additional exhibition building to be built in the block west across Polk from the Civic Auditorium.

By 1976, according to a proposal submitted to the city, "the existing building does not meet the expectations of today's conventioneer or exhibitor" and a renovation was proposed to update meeting rooms, offices, and restrooms." For instance, the Show Manager's Office was accessed through the vestibule of the men's restroom, which had "excessive odor" due to the use of absorptive grout, and a storage space was used for food service, rather than a dedicated kitchen.

Before 1981, the auditorium and Brooks Hall were used as the city's primary convention center; after that date bookings at Brooks Hall suffered because of competition from more modern event spaces such as Moscone Center (completed in 1981 and expanded in 1991), Fashion Center (completed in 1990 and later leased by Zynga as its headquarters), and the Marriott Hotel (completed in 1989). A 1987 report advocated retaining Brooks Hall as a cheaper alternative to Moscone Center, as the cost to rent Brooks was half that of Moscone, and hotels in Civic Center were more affordable as well. Events fell from a high of 26 held in 1988 to just 15 in 1993.

The space was closed to the public in April 1993 because of the construction of the new Main Library. The new Main Library was built on the Marshall Square block bounded by Larkin, Fulton, Hyde, and Grove streets, incorporating the Brooks Hall truck access ramp that "visually marred" the formal approach to City Hall from Market Street. The ramp, near the southwest corner of Fulton and Hyde, is still used by the Library and Brooks Hall.

In 1996, it was estimated that it would require a minimum investment of $1.6M to bring the facility in compliance with the ADA and fire codes, and possibly require up to $40M to refurbish the space for other uses. Following the closure of Brooks Hall, the city's Department of Convention Facilities transferred authority over the space to the real estate department after a 1996 study concluded there was no economical way to continue using it as an exhibition space.

A survey of existing conditions in 1998 concluded that the electrical, lighting, plumbing, fire alarm, and telecommunications systems, all of which dated to the original 1958 installation, were outdated and would require replacement if the space were used for anything other than storage or parking.

=== Current and proposed uses ===
As of 2019, Brooks Hall has not reopened as an exhibition site. Since the new Main Library has opened, Brooks Hall has been used to store library books. It has also been used to store historical artifacts, including the Exposition Organ, a 7,000-pipe organ originally manufactured for the 1915 Panama-Pacific International Exhibition. Plans to move the organ, which had been installed in the Civic Auditorium until it was damaged during the 1989 Loma Prieta earthquake, to a new pavilion near Embarcadero Plaza and the San Francisco Ferry Building never materialized. As of July 2023 the City has listed it for sale with a Maine-based instrument broker.

The site is also used by the San Francisco Department of Elections to stage ballots before they are distributed to polling places. It is also an alternate site for counting vote-by-mail ballots and dispatching poll workers. Although access to unvoted ballots is intended to be limited, workers have complained the fencing surrounding their area is not secure; access to Brooks Hall is difficult, as the main pedestrian stairway is steep, slippery, and often unsanitary due to public urination; restroom plumbing is inadequate; and electrical circuits are often overloaded.

In 1998, the San Francisco Department of Public Works released A Program for Renovation and Revitalization, a report that explored concepts to renovate and reuse existing city assets in Civic Center, including Brooks Hall. Four conversion alternatives were brought forth:

1. Parking garage, costing $11.3 M
2. Public storage, costing $1.3 M
3. Public access television studio, office spaces, and exhibit areas (with parking), costing $15.4 M
4. Multi-media production center with parking, costing $14.9 M

In 2000, a report to the San Francisco Library Commission proposed renovating Brooks Hall and converting it into the city archive at a cost of $10 million. Other ideas proposed for its reuse included a computer museum, an antiques mart, an expansion of the nearby parking garage, a food hall, a performance hall, a farmer's market, or a city-run television studio. In 2018, CMG Landscape Architecture unveiled three proposals to redesign the entire Civic Center open spaces, including a Culture Connector design variant that would open public access to Brooks Hall through a canopy-covered set of stairs just north of Grove Street.

Brooks Hall traces as of 2019
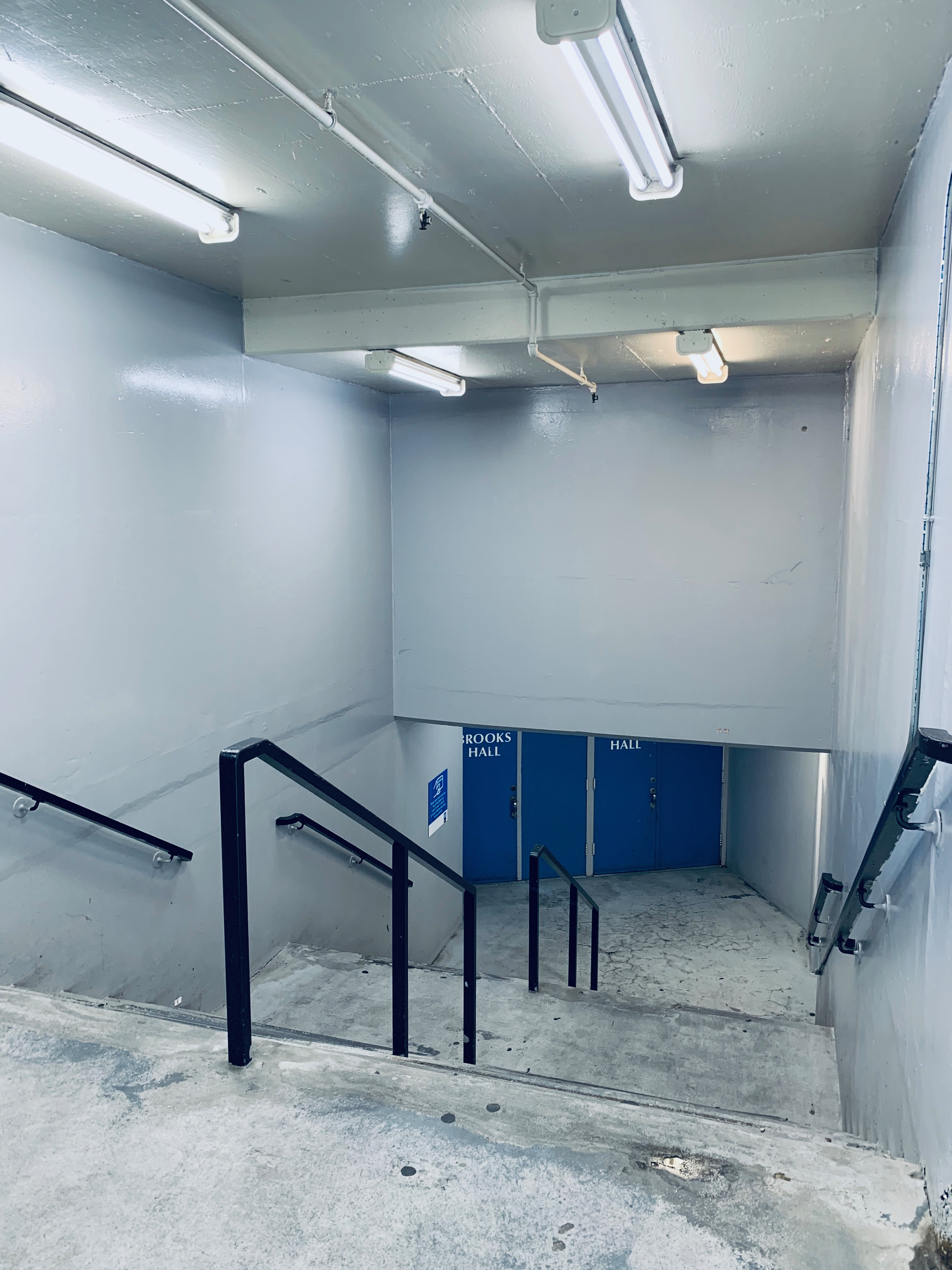
Doors to Brooks Hall underneath the San Francisco Civic Center

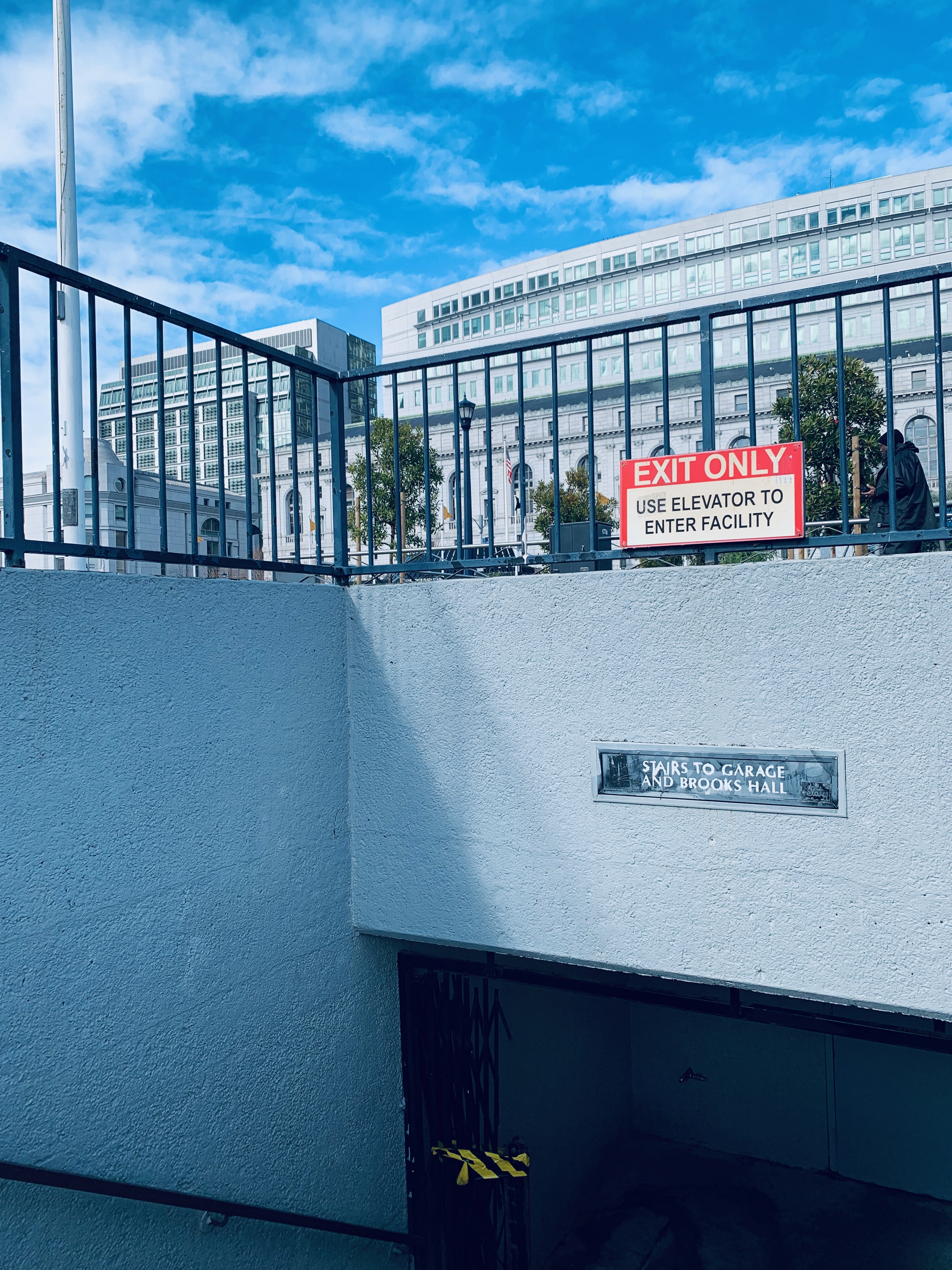
Signage at the San Francisco Civic Center Garage, mentioning Brooks Hall

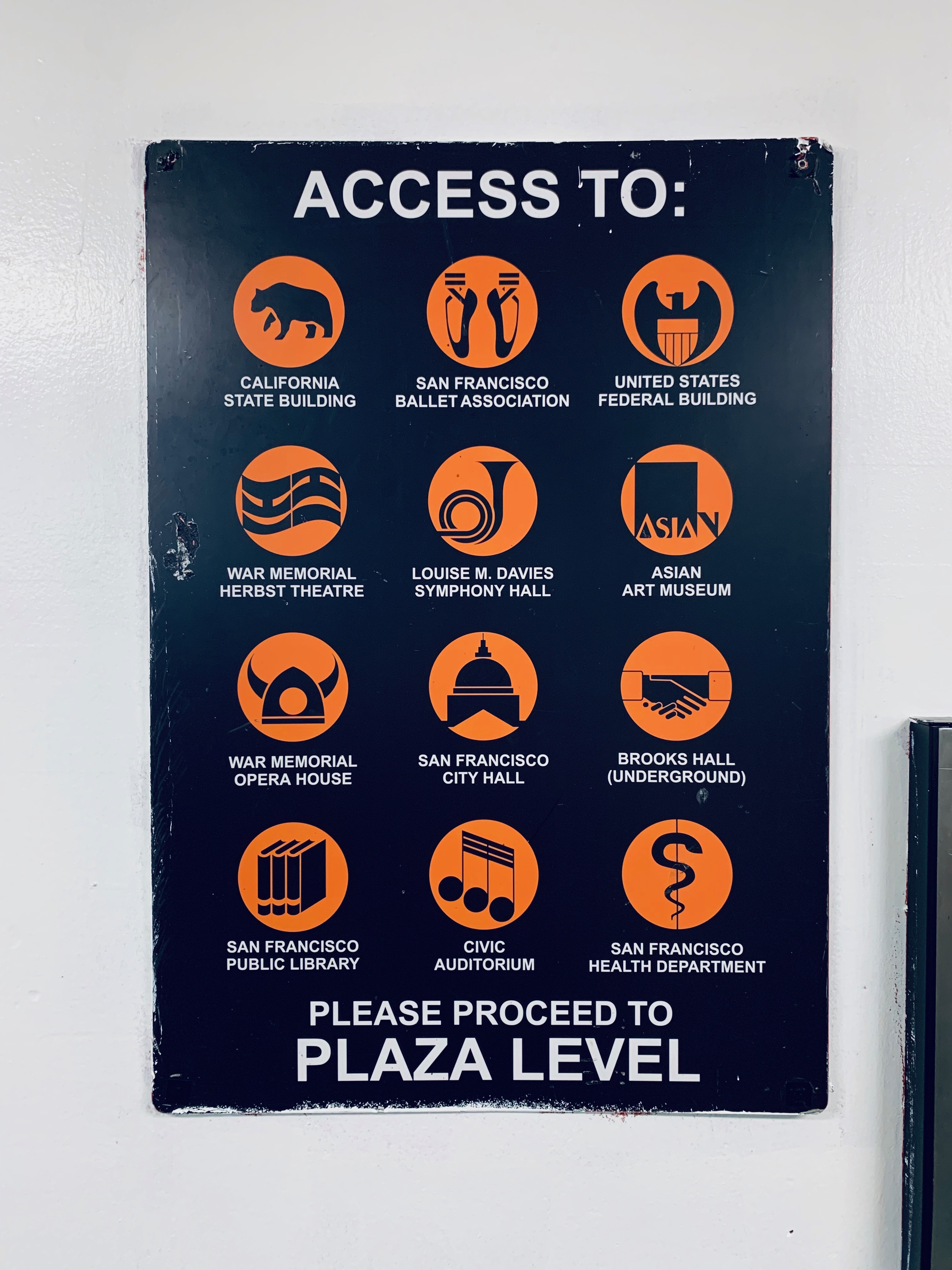
Civic Center Garage signage, pointing to Brooks Hall and other nearby facilities

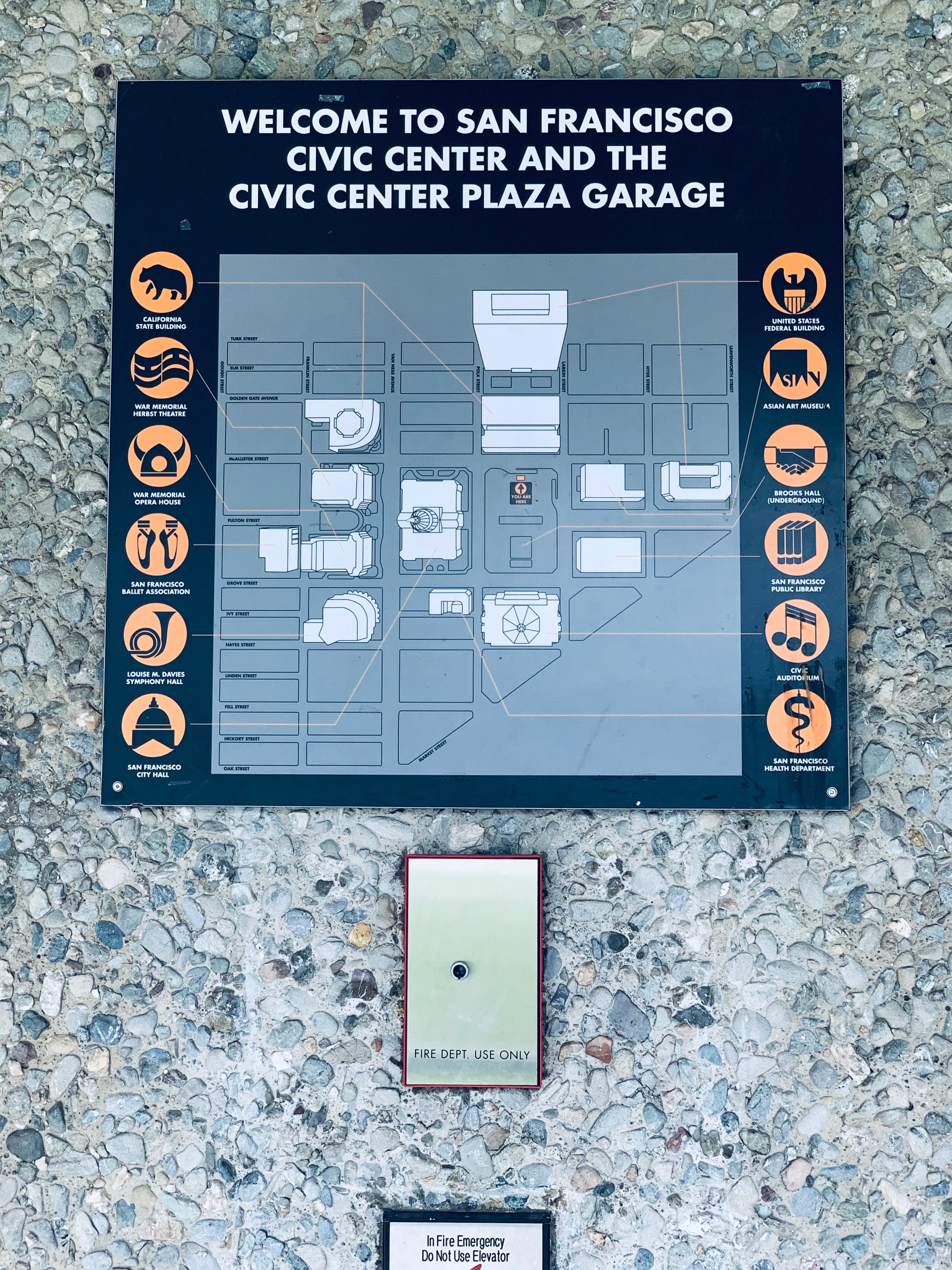
Civic Center Garage map, pointing to Brooks Hall and other nearby facilities

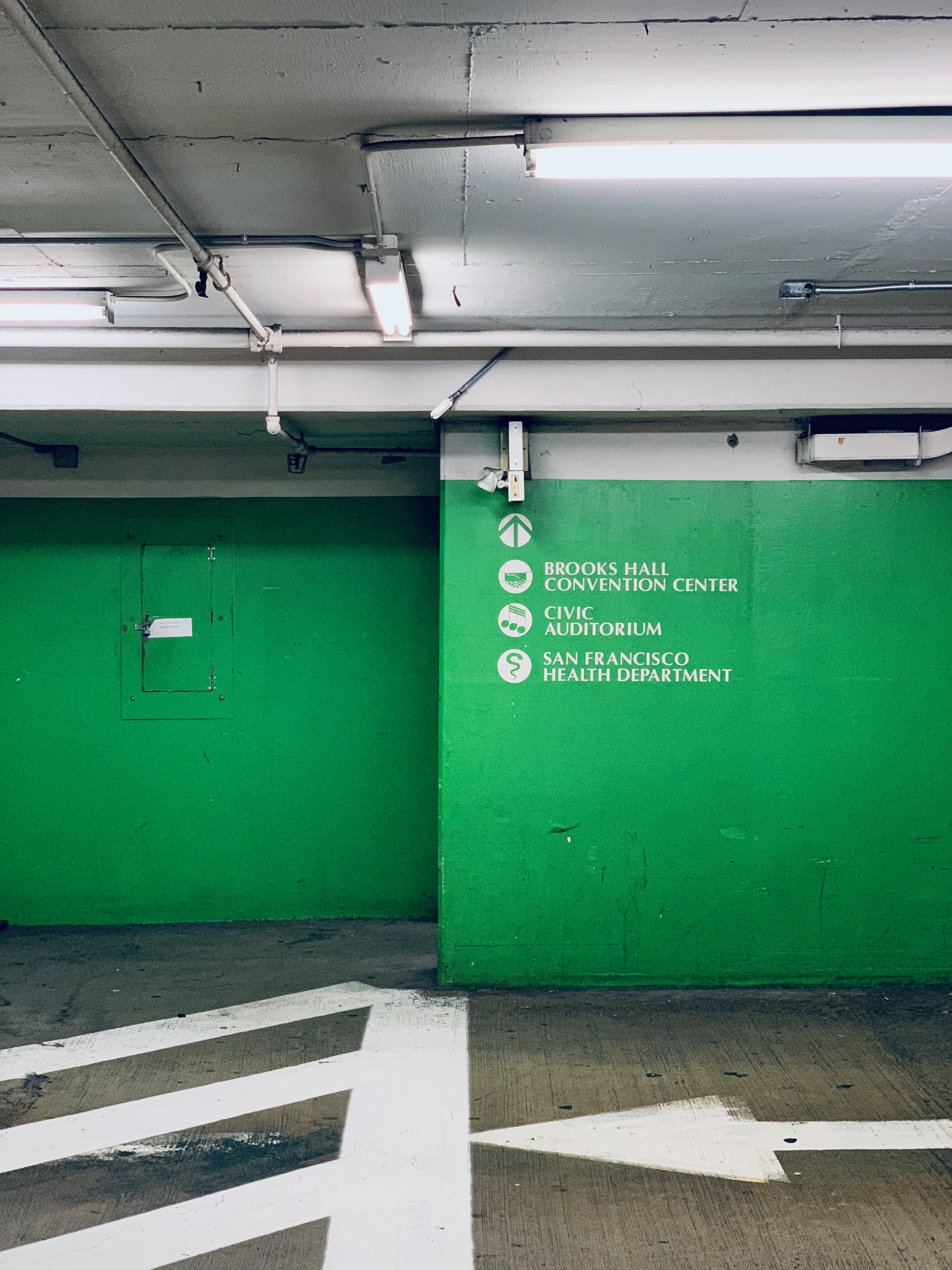
Signage at the San Francisco Civic Center Garage
