= Phillip Burton Federal Building =

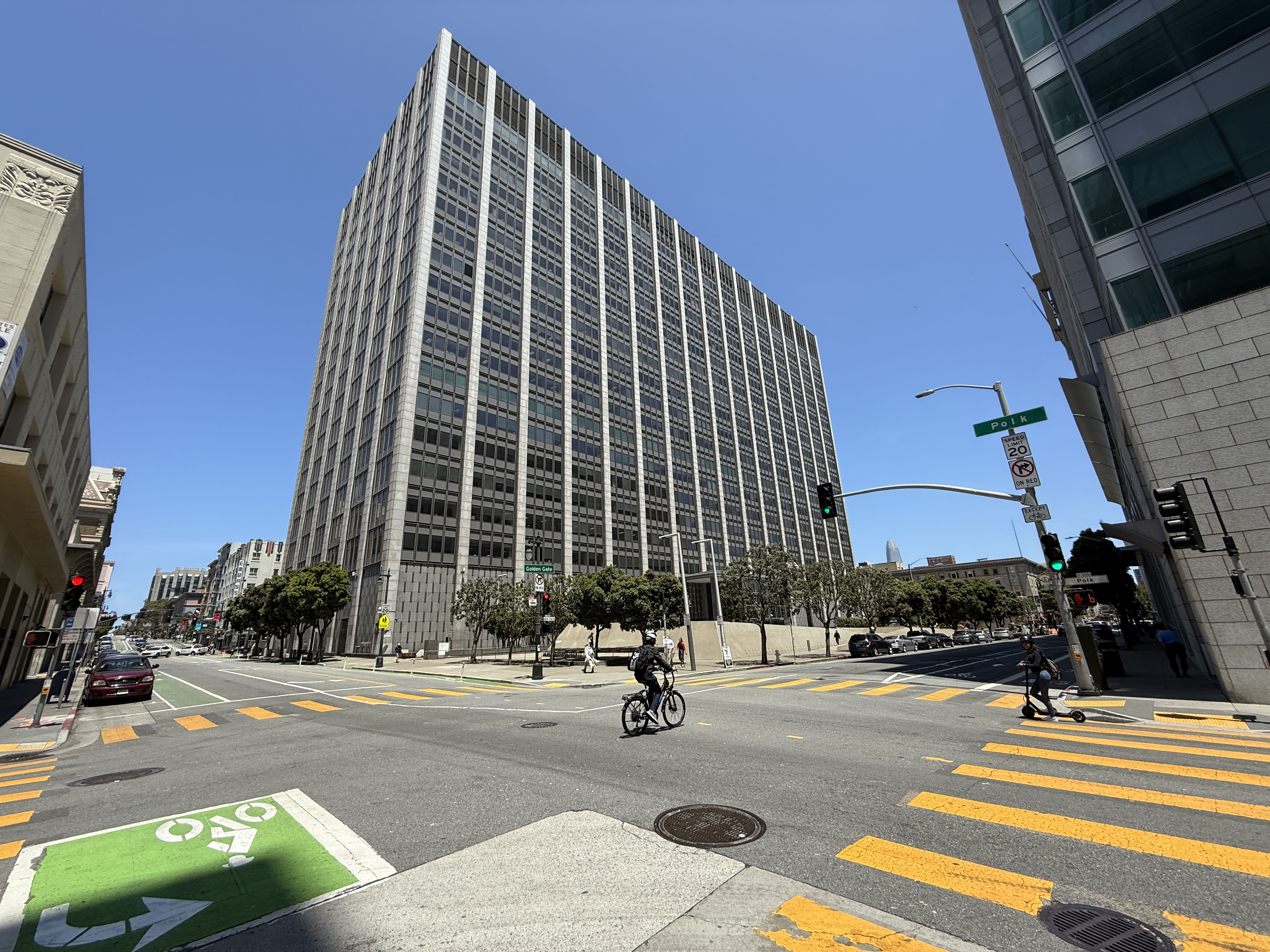

- Location within San Francisco Phillip Burton Federal Bldg. (California)

General information
- Status: Completed
- Type: Office
- Location: 450 Golden Gate Avenue; San Francisco
- Coordinates: 37°46′54.5″N 122°25′05.1″W
- Opening: 1964

Height
- Roof: 312 ft (95 m)

Technical details
- Floor count: 21

Design and construction
- Architects: John Carl Warnecke and Associates

The Phillip Burton Federal Building & United States Courthouse is a massive 21-floor, 312 feet (95 m) federal office building located at 450 Golden Gate Avenue near San Francisco's Civic Center and the San Francisco City Hall. The building occupies an entire city block, bounded by Golden Gate Avenue at the south, Turk Street at the north, Polk Street at the west, and Larkin Street at the east.

Designed by the local architectural firm of John Carl Warnecke and Associates in the International Style, construction was completed in 1964.

It serves as one of four courthouses for the United States District Court for the Northern District of California. The building was finished in 1964, one of the earliest office towers for San Francisco. It is named for former U.S. Representative Phillip Burton.

== Occupants ==
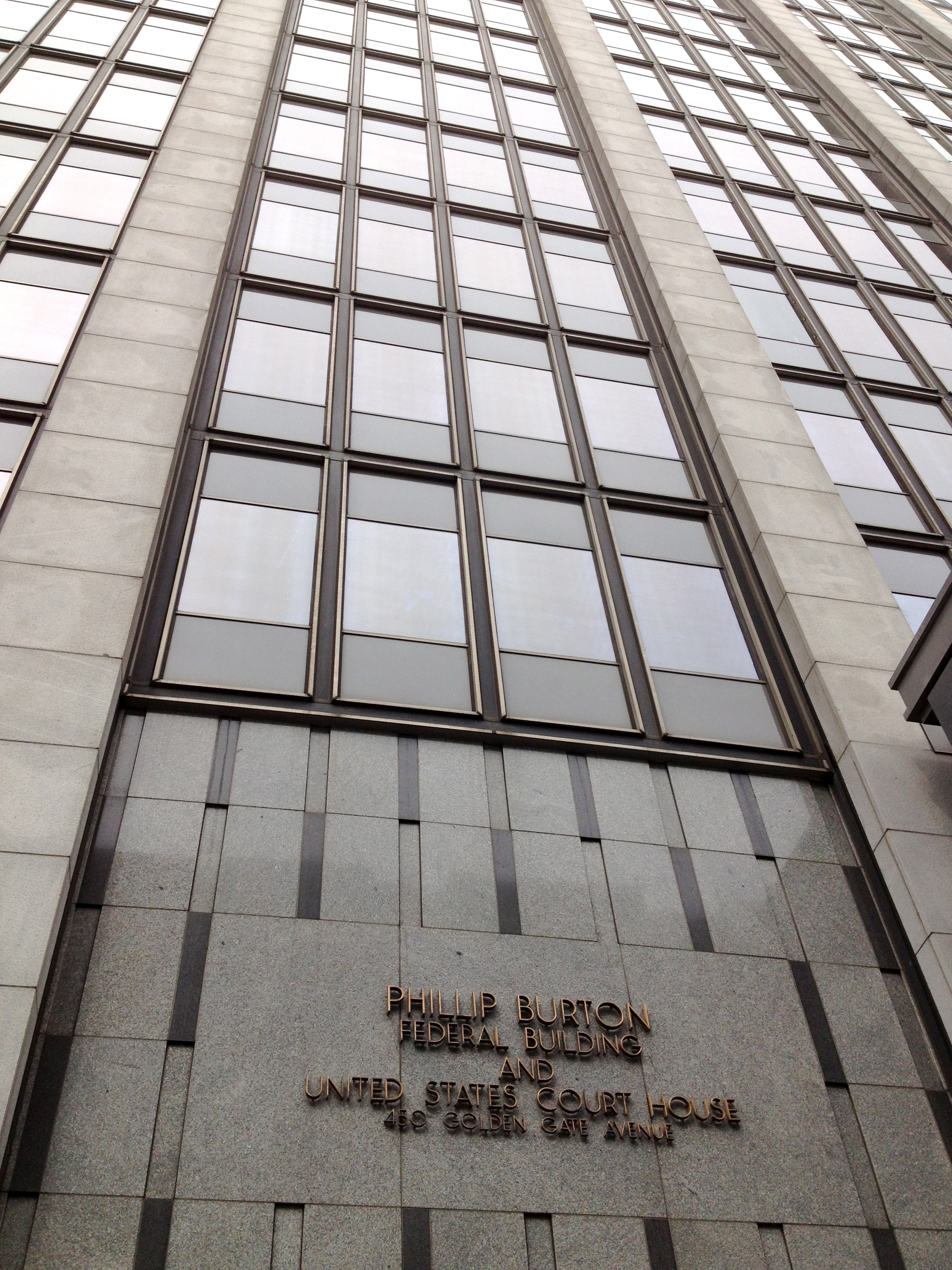
Close up photograph of the Phillip Burton Federal Building.

Cafe 450 – 2nd Fl.

Federal Bureau of Investigation San Francisco Field Office – 13th Fl.

Northern California Regional Intelligence Center - NCRIC & Northern California High Intensity Drug Trafficking Area - NC HIDTA San Francisco – 14th Fl.

Federal Public Defender – 19th Fl.

Internal Revenue Service Help Center – 1st Fl.

U.S. Army Corps of Engineers

U.S. Attorney's Office – 11th and 9th Fl.

U.S. Department of Justice Antitrust Division – 10th Fl.

U.S. District Court for the Northern District of California

U.S. Marshals Service – 20th Fl.

San Francisco Passport Agency – 3rd Fl.

U.S. Pretrial Services – 18th Fl.

U.S. Probation – 17th Fl.

== See also ==
- List of tallest buildings in San Francisco
