= Earl Warren Building =

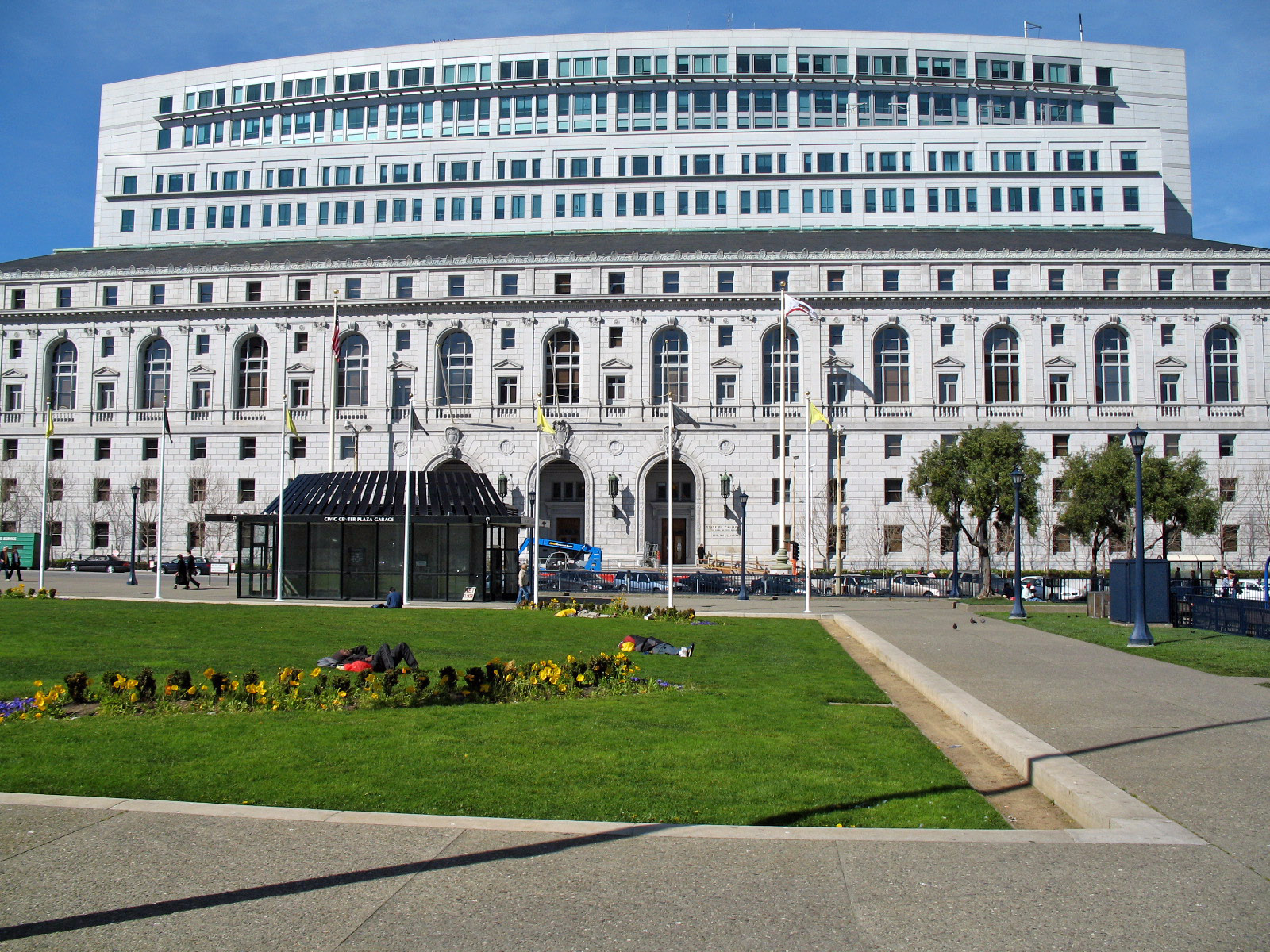

- Location within San Francisco Earl Warren Bldg. (California) Earl Warren Bldg. (the United States)

General information
- Status: Completed
- Type: Office
- Location: 350 McAllister Street; San Francisco
- Coordinates: 37°46′50.53″N 122°25′4.26″W
- Opening: 1922

Height
- Roof: 87 ft (27 m)

Technical details
- Floor count: 6

Design and construction
- Architects: Bliss & Faville and Page & Turnbull, Inc.

The Earl Warren Building located at 350 McAllister Street in San Francisco, California is the headquarters of the Supreme Court of California. The building was completed in 1922, and is named for 30th governor of California and 14th Chief Justice of the United States, Earl Warren. The Supreme Court first held oral argument in the building in 1923. The building is part of the Ronald M. George State Office Complex (the San Francisco Civic Center Complex) along with the Hiram W. Johnson State Office Building.

The building's facade features granite and terra-cotta masonry and is done in the Beaux-Arts architectural style. Inside, the courtroom for the Supreme Court is paneled in oak and features a coffered ceiling and a skylight 30 feet in height. A mural above the judges' bench depicts a California landscape. After the 1989 Loma Prieta earthquake, the court vacated the building, eventually returning in 1999.
