= Main Library (San Francisco) =

Public library in San Francisco, California, US

San Francisco Main Library
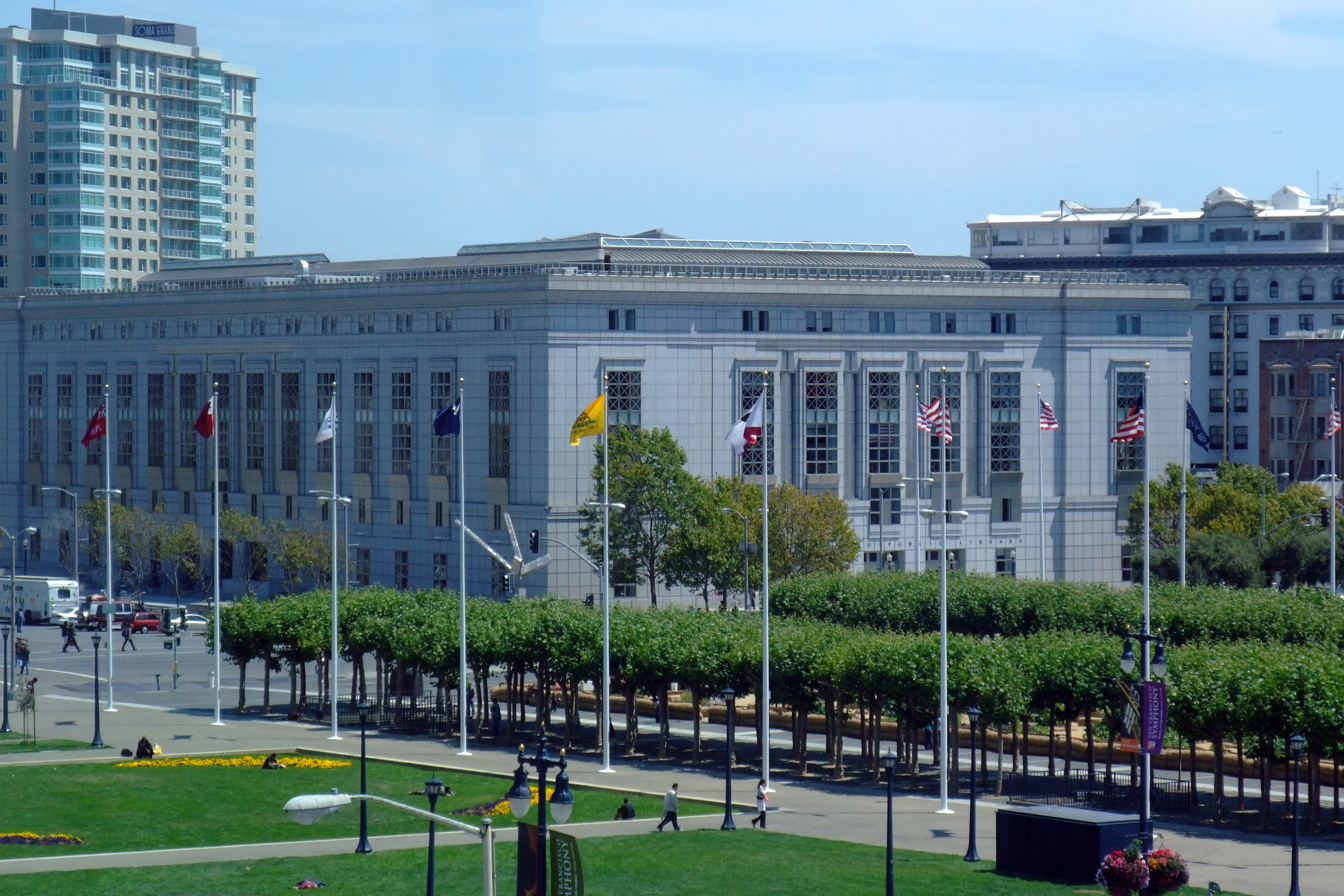
- The library's exterior in 2008

- Location within San Francisco

General information
- Type: Public Library
- Architectural style: Beaux-Arts Revival
- Location: 100 Larkin Street; San Francisco, California; 94102
- Coordinates: 37°46′45″N 122°25′05″W
- Opening: April 18, 1996
- Cost: $109.5 million
- Owner: San Francisco Public Library

Technical details
- Floor count: 7
- Floor area: 376,000 sq ft (34,900 m^{2})

Design and construction
- Architects: Pei Cobb Freed & Partners and Simon Martin-Vegue Winkelstein Moris
- Developer: San Francisco Public Library

The Main Library is the primary library of the San Francisco Public Library, located in San Francisco's Civic Center.

== History ==
In 1986, a task force was set up to complete the design of the Civic Center, including the use of Marshall Square, next to the main library at the time, for a new main library. Construction on the current Main Library began on March 15, 1993, financed by a US$109.5 million bond measure. The building was completed in 1995 and opened a year later on April 18, 1996. The old main library, which was damaged in the 1989 Loma Prieta earthquake, was rebuilt as the new Asian Art Museum.

At over 376,000 square feet (34,900 m^{2}) and with six floors above ground and one below, the new library is more than twice as big as the building it replaced. The new library includes over 300 computer terminals, room for 1100 laptops, and a new wing for children. The city spent $104.5 million on the new library. Library visits doubled in its first year open, from 1.1 million to 2.1 million, and the number of library card holders nearly tripled.

In October 1996 author Nicholson Baker wrote a critical article in The New Yorker about the weeding of books from the library as it moved to the new building. He was also critical about the elimination of the card catalog when the computerized catalog was introduced. Due to this negative publicity, the library released an official response to Nicholson's New Yorker article, criticizing his claims. There has also been criticism in the local press that the atrium significantly and deliberately reduced the amount of floor space available for shelving the library's collection which resulted in the destruction of over 200,000 books which were then buried in a landfill, gutting the research collections of one of the most important research facilities on the West Coast, all of which occurred away from public sight or review. Later, under intense pressure that included then Mayor Willie Brown, City Librarian Ken Dowlin whose policy it was to weed and subsequently destroy the books, was forced to resign in January 1997.

The library was prominently used in the 1998 film City of Angels.

== San Francisco History Center ==
The San Francisco History Center houses over two million historical photos, postcards, negatives, glass plates, oral histories, ephemera, correspondence, and other materials. The Center houses a punk rock archive and is the designated archive of the City and County of San Francisco. There is additional archival storage below civic center plaza. The Center is on the sixth floor and sometimes houses art collections of materials curated from its archives in the hallway just outside its entrance.

== Art ==
The main library has hosted art exhibits in the Jewett Gallery and Skylight Gallery, on subjects such as Japanese Tattoo art, skateboarding in San Francisco, watercolors of neighborhoods by a local artist, and copier art. The library also has permanent exhibits such as a monument to Maya Angelou and a five-story green wall inside the atrium that features the names of 160 authors in LED lights created by Nayland Blake.

== Gallery ==
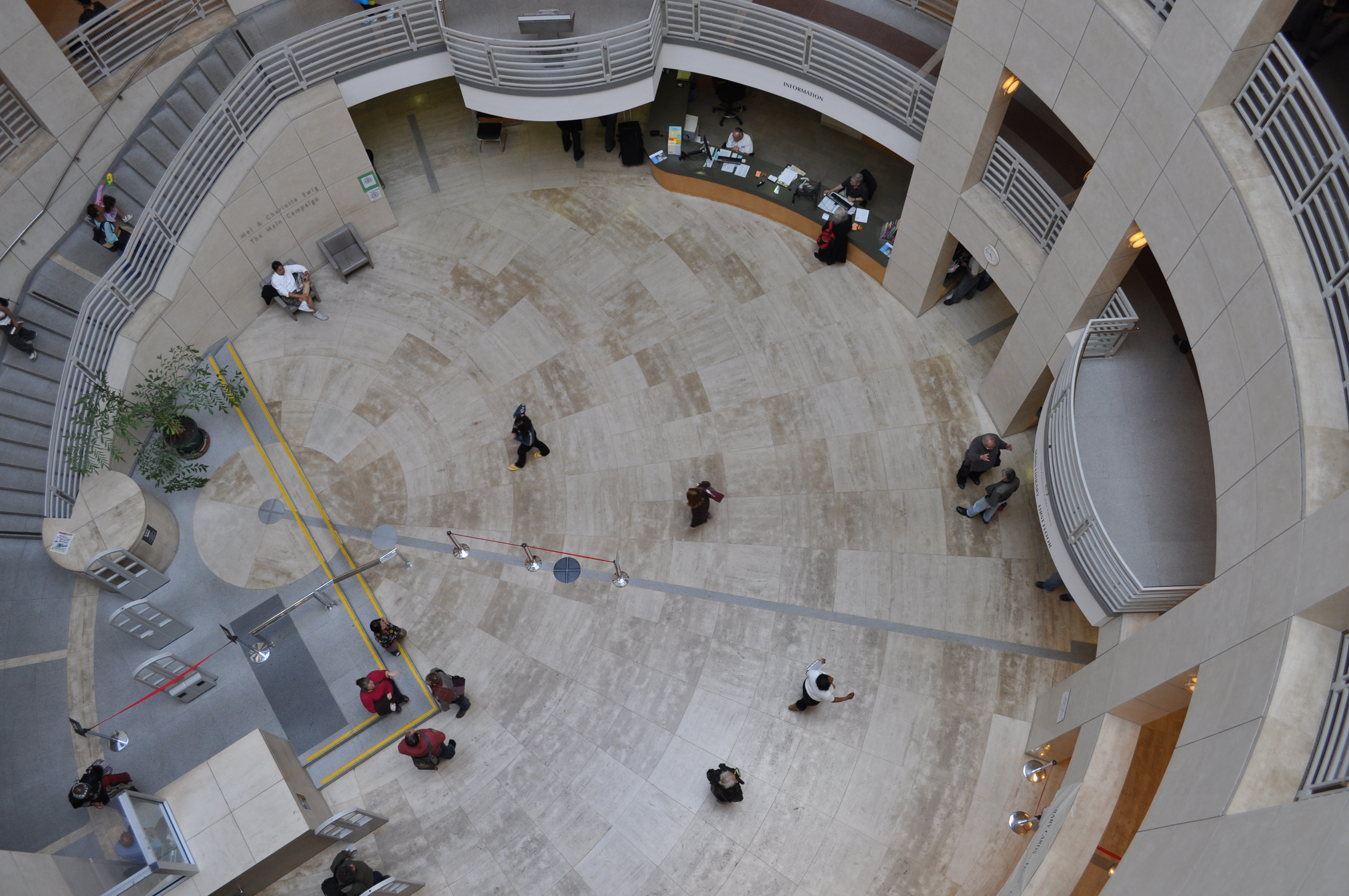
Looking down in the atrium, 2009

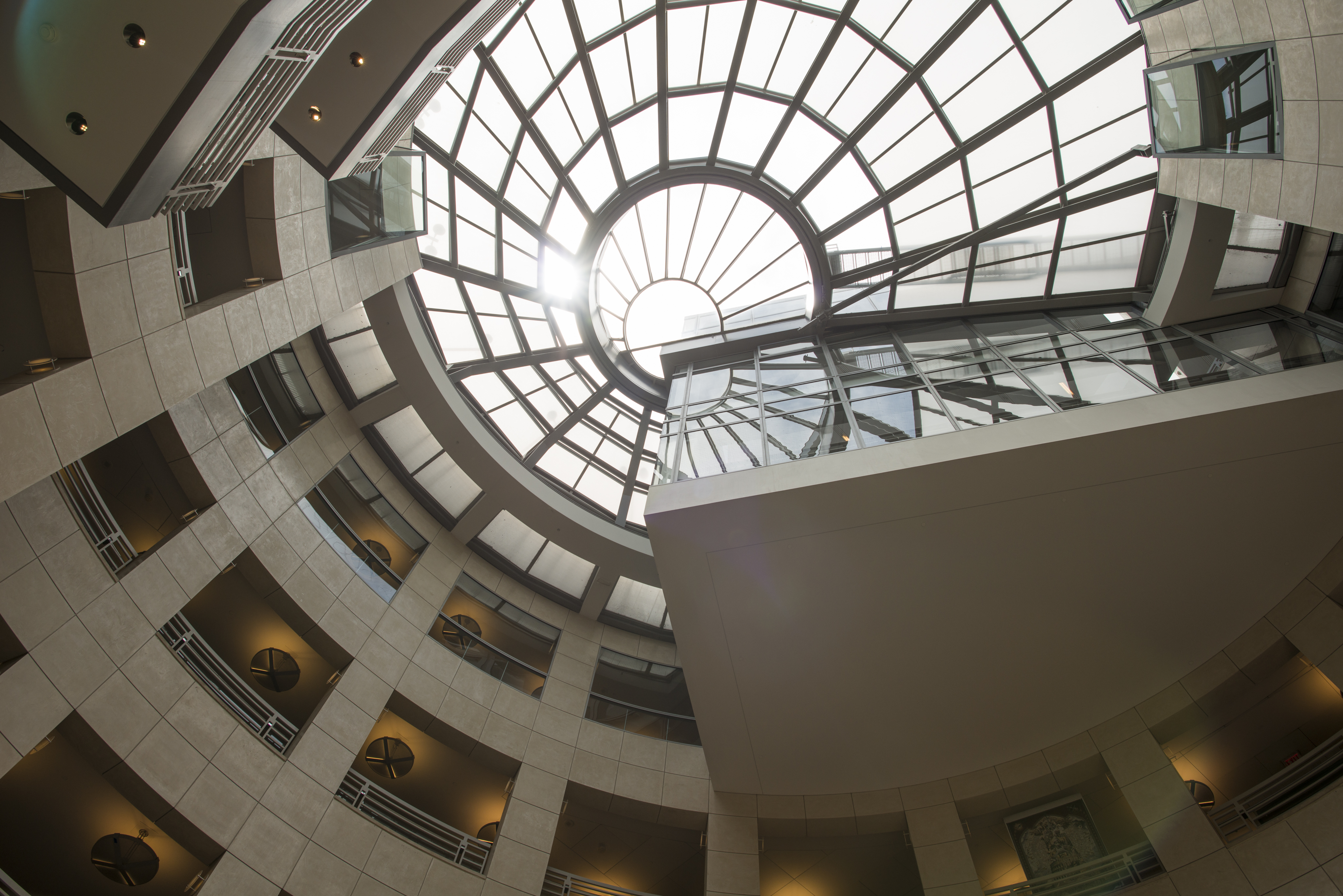
Looking up at the ceiling from the first floor

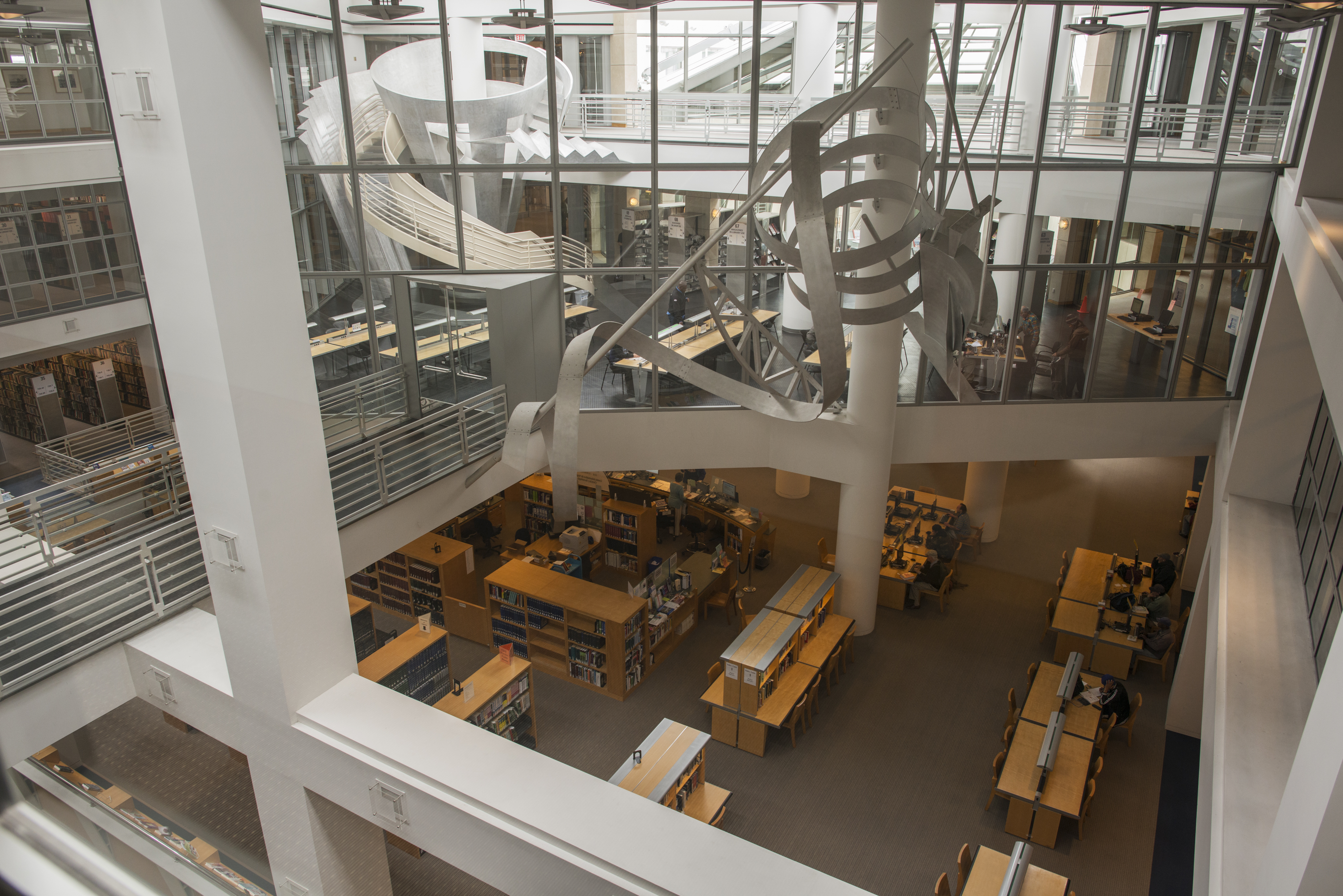
View of art installations from 6th floor

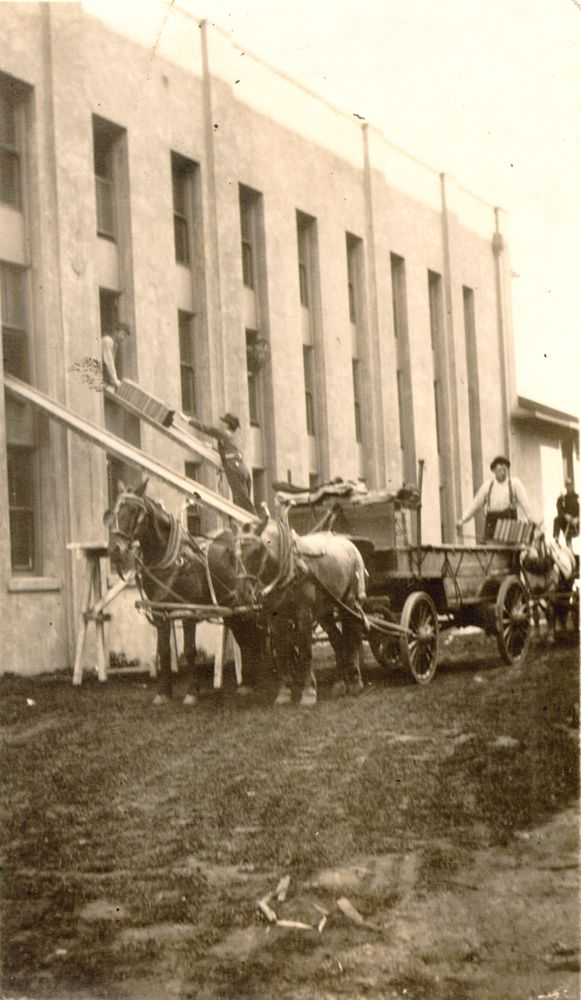
1917: Moving to permanent Main Library

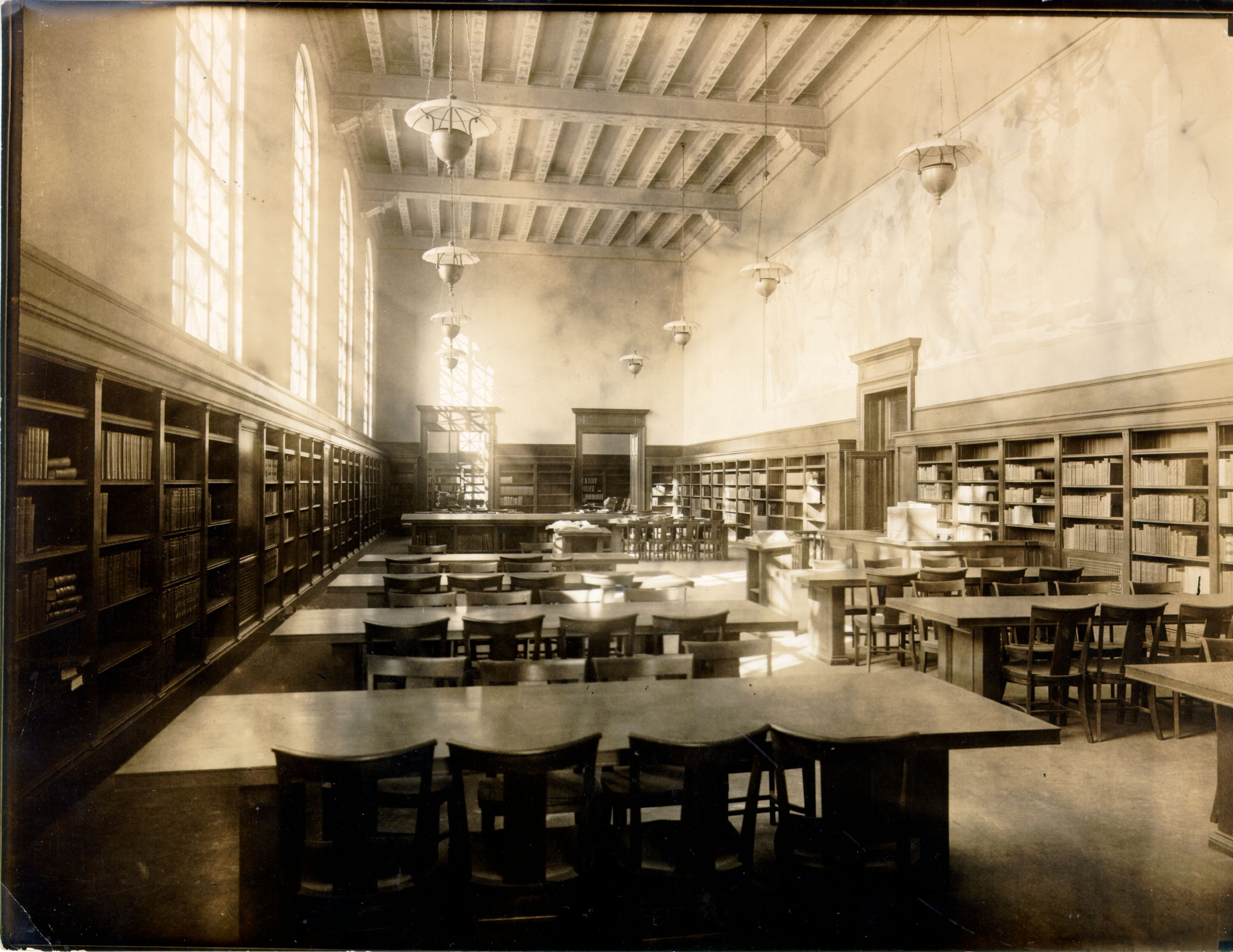
History department circa 1918-19
