= Fox Plaza (San Francisco) =

Building in San Francisco, California, US

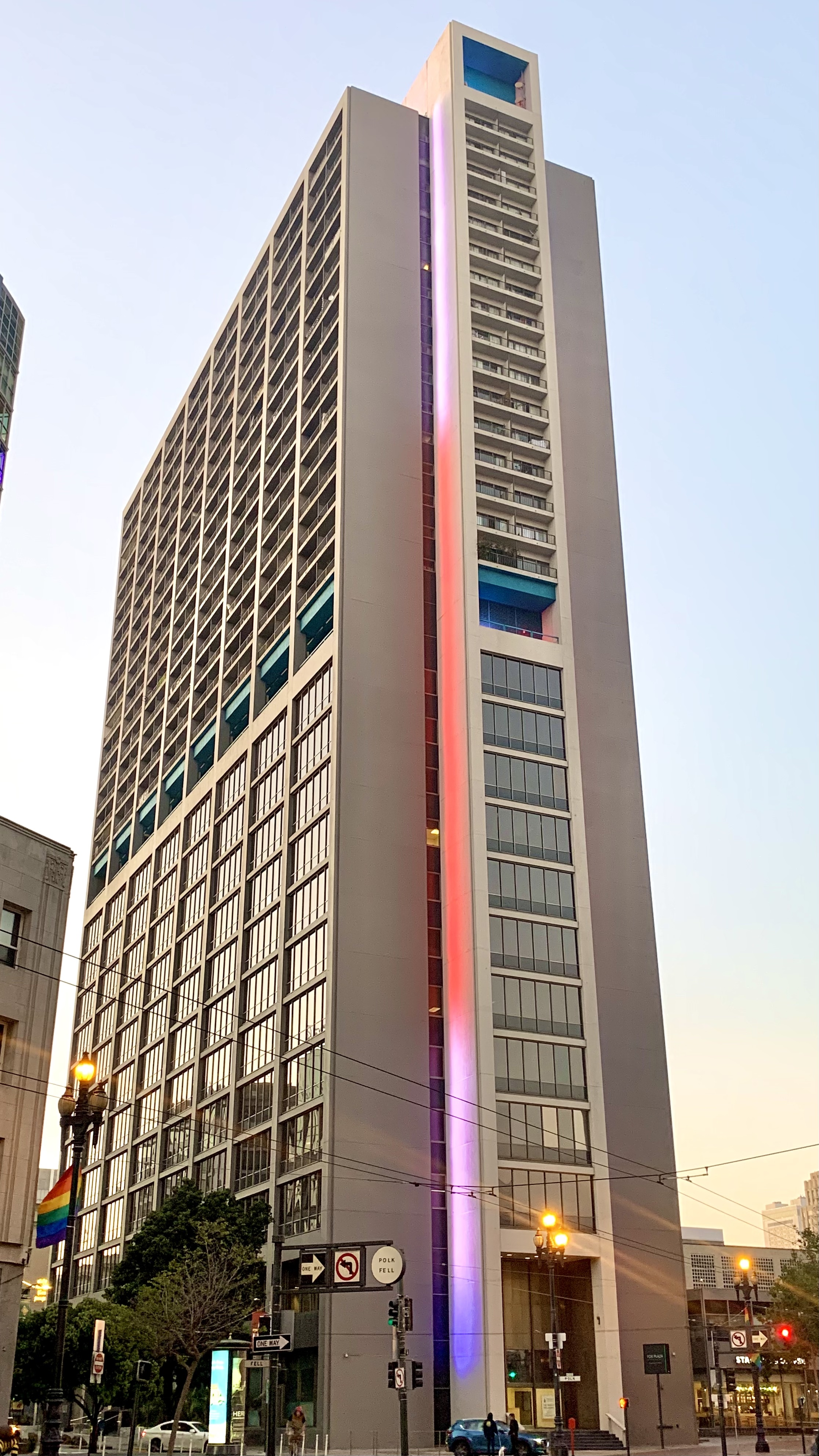
- In 2021

- Location within San Francisco Fox Plaza (San Francisco) (California) Fox Plaza (San Francisco) (the United States)

General information
- Type: Commercial offices Residential
- Location: 1390 Market Street; San Francisco, California
- Coordinates: 37.77714°N 122.41723°W
- Completed: 1966
- Owner: Asn Fox Plaza LLC

Height
- Roof: 107.9 m (354 ft)

Technical details
- Floor count: 29
- Floor area: 804,120 sq ft (74,705 m^{2})
- Lifts/elevators: 3

Design and construction
- Architect: Victor Gruen Associates
- Main contractor: Cahill Contractors

Fox Plaza is a 29-story building located at 1390 Market Street in the Civic Center area of San Francisco. Built in 1966, the tower stands 354 ft (108 m) on the site of the former historic Fox Theatre at 1350 Market, which was opened in June 1929 and demolished in 1963.

The first twelve floors contain office space. Unlike many buildings, Fox Plaza has a 13th floor actually labeled "13", although this floor is the service floor and is not rented out. The 14th floor contains laundry facilities as well as apartments, while floors 15 through 29 are exclusively rental apartments. The ground floor contains a gymnasium for residents.

There is a corner low-rise retail component in which a virtual-reality gym, offices, Starbucks, and a U.S. Post Office operate. The site formerly housed a credit union. The buildings' current owners are in the early planning and permitting stage of demolishing the low-rise retail and replacing it with a 120 ft (37 m) building containing condominiums.

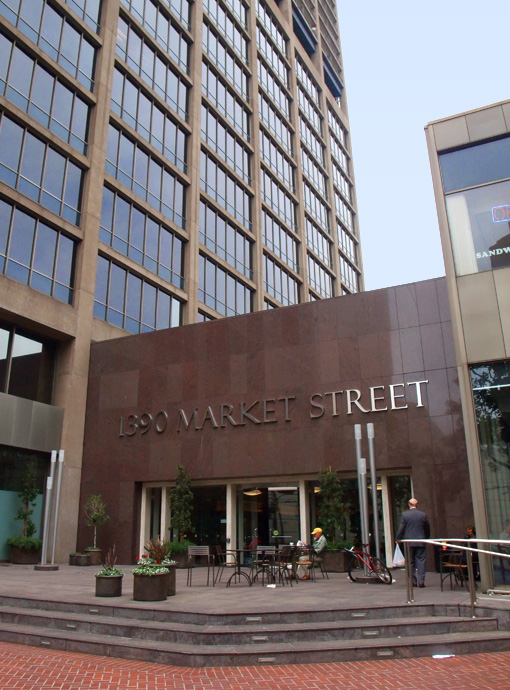
Market Street main entrance

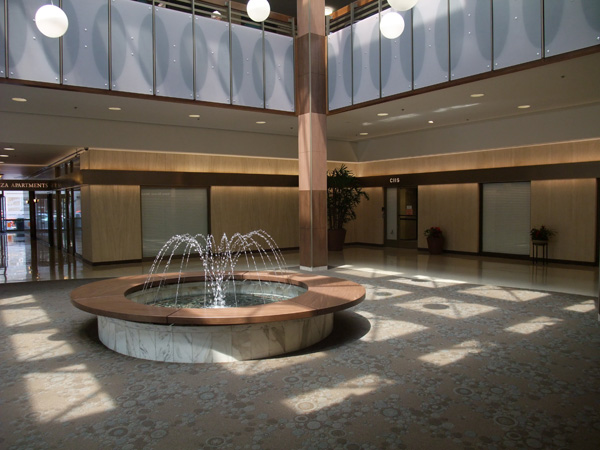
Ground floor lobby

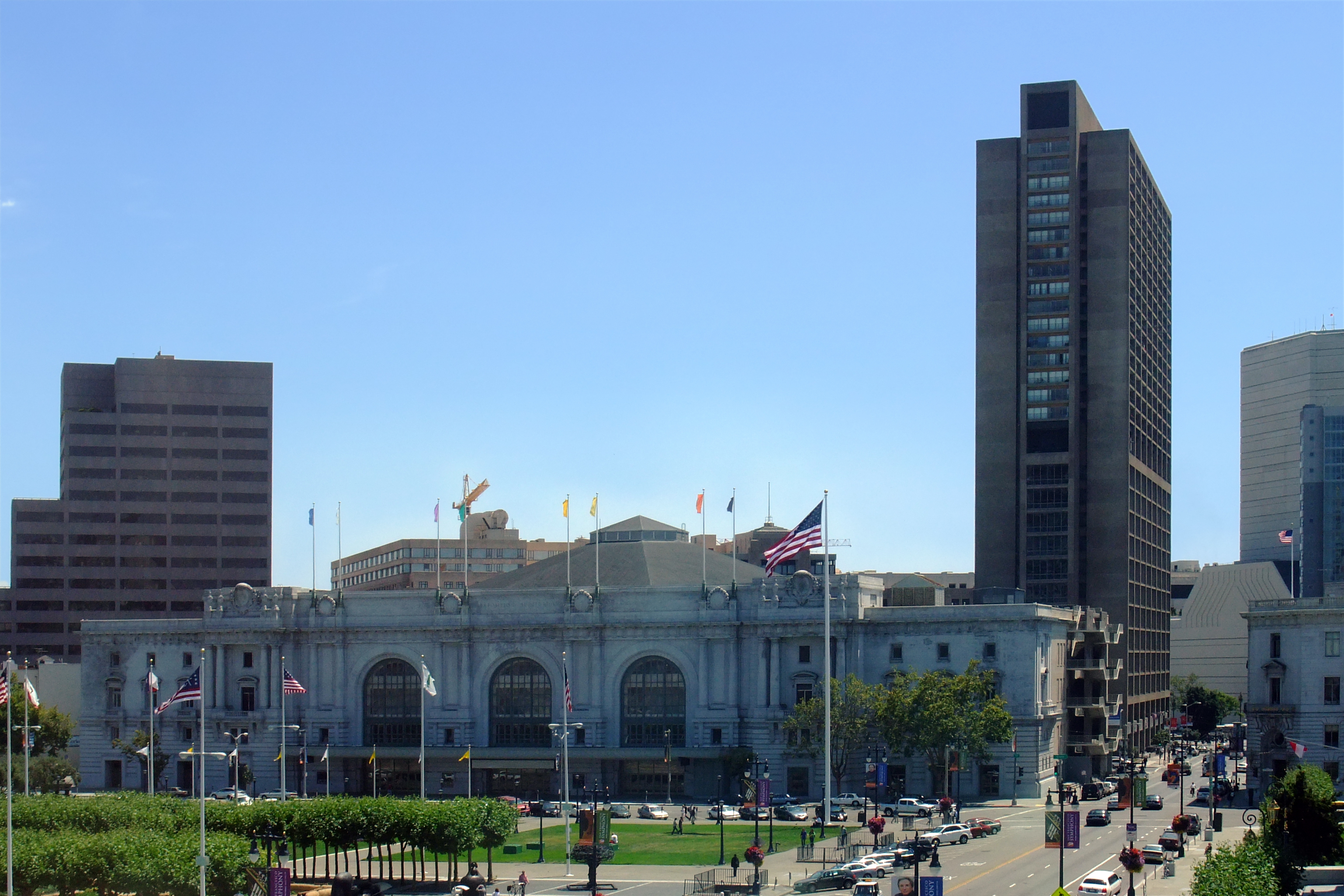
Seen from San Francisco City Hall behind Bill Graham Auditorium

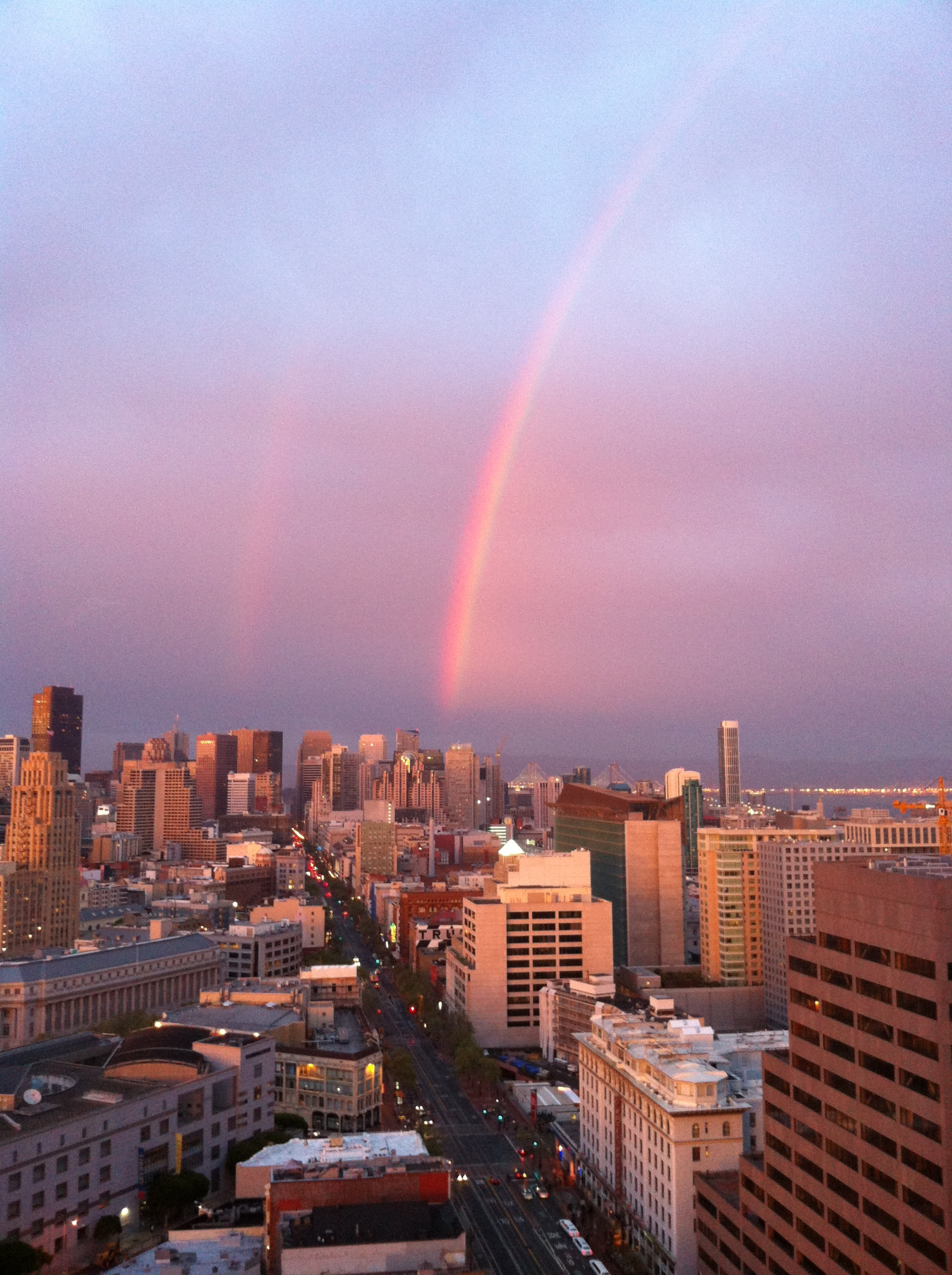
View from the 24th floor facing east

Timelapse view from the 24th floor facing east the bay lights visible in the background

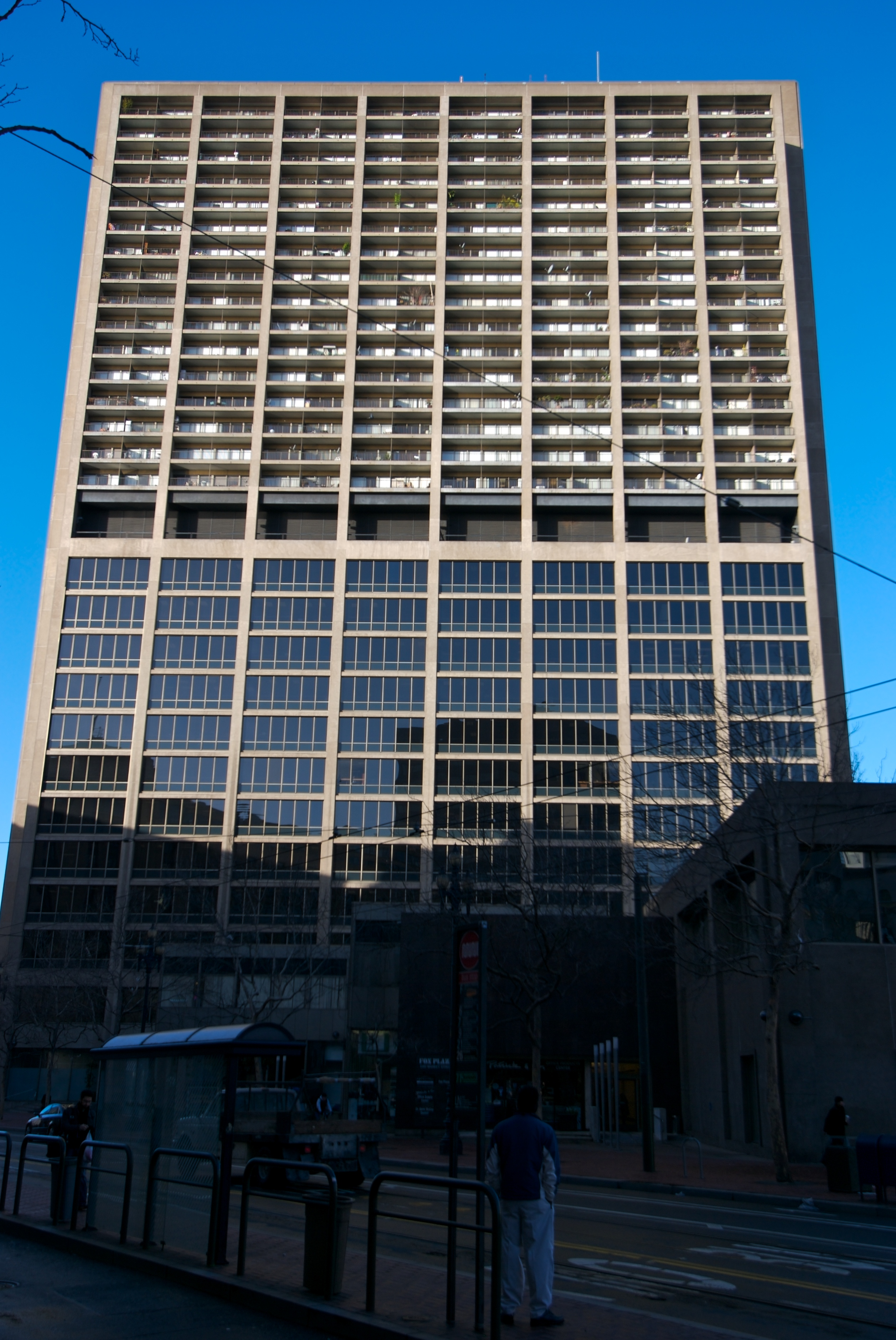
Fox Plaza c. 2008

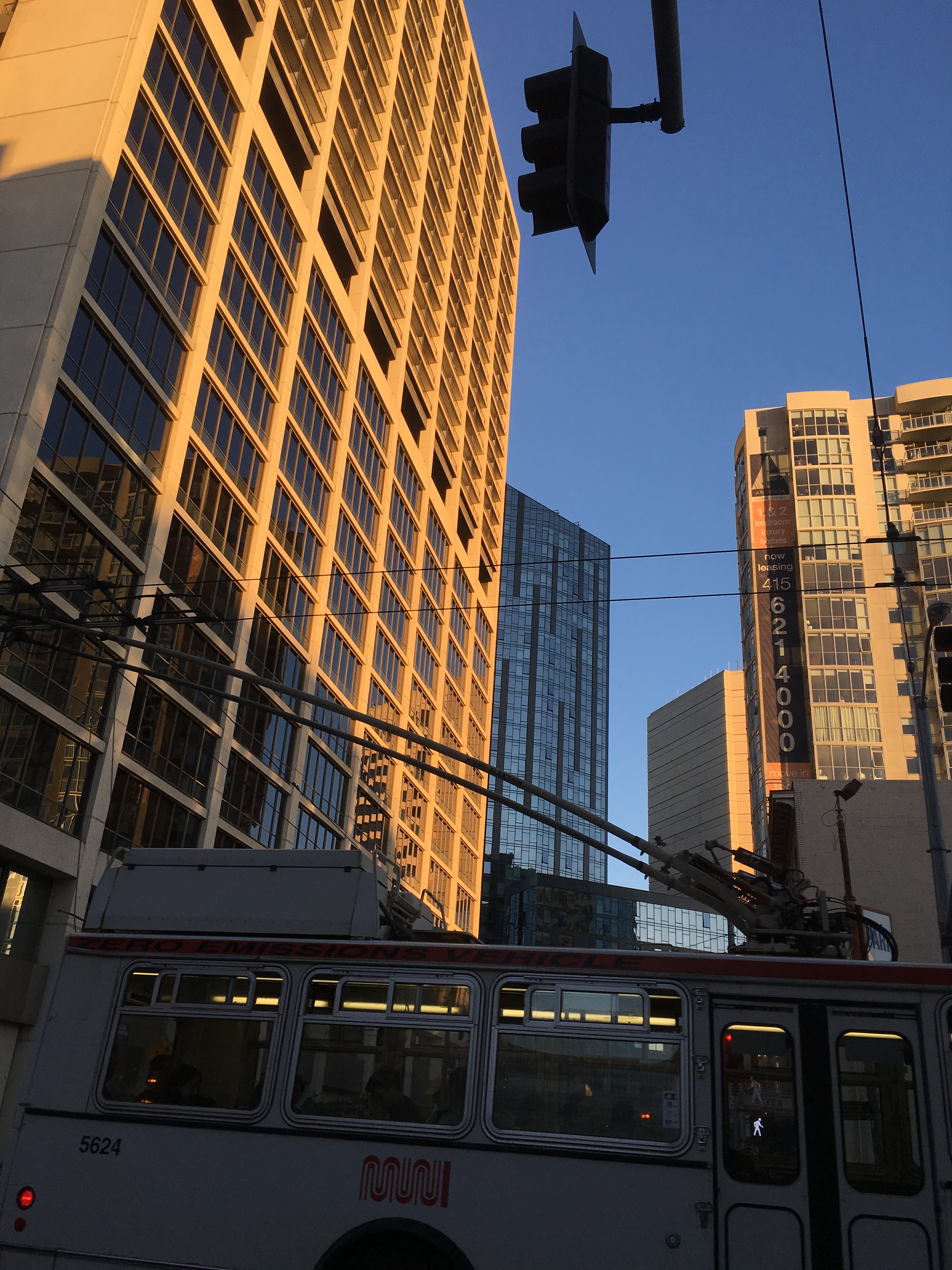
Near the intersection of Polk and Hayes Street

== See also ==
- California Institute of Integral Studies
- List of tallest buildings in San Francisco
