= 1943 in art =

Events from the year 1943 in art.

== Events ==
- January – After attending the Casablanca Conference, Prime Minister of the United Kingdom and amateur painter Winston Churchill produces his only wartime painting, a view of the Kutubiyya Mosque in Marrakesh, as a gift for President of the United States Franklin D. Roosevelt.
- January 5–February 6 – Exhibition by 31 Women is staged at Peggy Guggenheim's The Art of This Century gallery on Manhattan, New York.
- February 20 – The painter David Olère is arrested by French police during a round up of Jews in Seine-et-Oise and spends the rest of World War II in Nazi concentration camps.
- Spring – The first exhibition of collage in the United States is shown in the Daylight Gallery of Peggy Guggenheim's The Art of This Century gallery on Manhattan.
- September – Retreating German troops deliberately destroy most of the collection of the Museo Civico Filangieri in Naples.
- September 21 – German-Jewish painter Charlotte Salomon, in hiding in the south of France, is arrested by the Gestapo, ending the autobiographical series of 769 paintings Leben? oder Theater?: Ein Singspiel ("Life? or Theater?: A Song-play").
- November 9 – Jackson Pollock's first solo exhibition opens in the Daylight Gallery of Peggy Guggenheim's The Art of This Century gallery on Manhattan.
- December 9 – Willem de Kooning marries Elaine Fried in New York City.
- Filming in the United States of a version of The Picture of Dorian Gray uses an original work by Ivan Albright as the title picture.

== Awards ==
- Archibald Prize: William Dobell – Joshua Smith

== Works ==
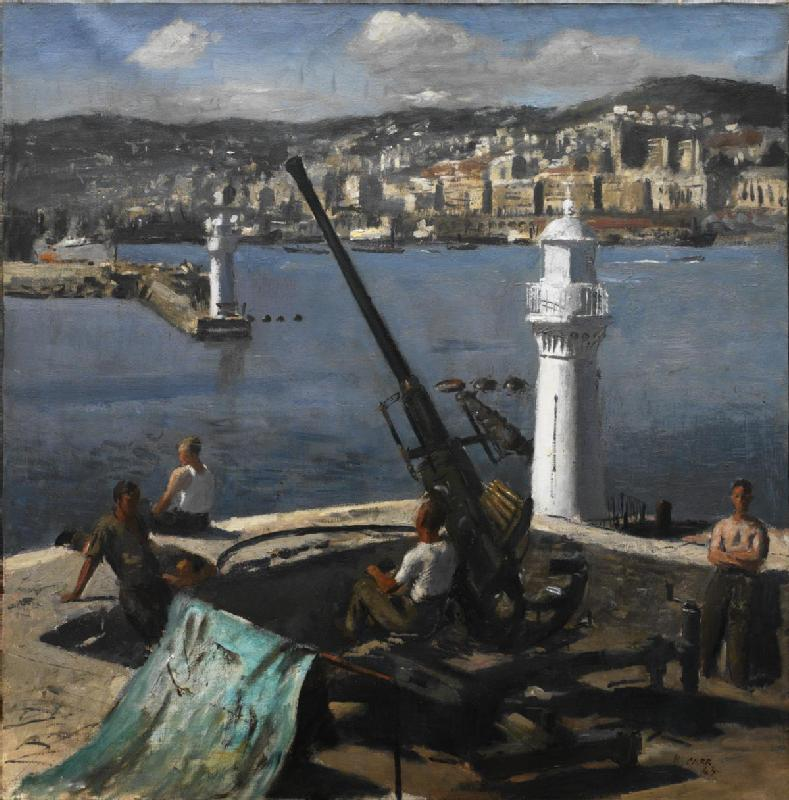
A Bofors Gun, Algiers, Henry Carr

- Constantin Brâncuși – The Seal (sculpture, Musée National d'Art Moderne, Paris)
- Paul Cadmus – The Shower
- Salvador Dalí – Geopoliticus Child Watching the Birth of the New Man
- William Dobell – The Billy Boy
- Jean Dubuffet – Cows and Groomers
- M. C. Escher – Reptiles (lithograph)
- Murray Griffin – Roberts Hospital, Changi
- Barbara Hepworth – Oval Sculpture
- Edward Hopper – Hotel Lobby
- Dame Laura Knight – Ruby Loftus Screwing a Breech Ring
- Wifredo Lam – The Jungle
- L. S. Lowry
  - Britain at Play
  - Going to Work
  - Waiting for the Shop to Open
- George Platt Lynes – Marsden Hartley (photograph)
- Piet Mondrian
  - Broadway Boogie-Woogie
  - Trafalgar Square (completed)
- Walter Thomas Monnington – Clouds and Spitfires
- Paul Nash – Landscape of the Vernal Equinox
- Felix Nussbaum – Self-portrait with Jewish identity card
- Arthur Pan – Winston Churchill
- Mervyn Peake
  - The Evolution of the Cathode Ray (Radiolocation) Tube
  - Glass-blowers 'Gathering' from the Furnace
- Jackson Pollock –
  - Mural (for Peggy Guggenheim)
  - Guardians of the Secret
- Norman Rockwell – Four Freedoms (paintings)
- Walter Russell – Four Freedoms Monument
- Xul Solar – Fiordo
- Dorothea Tanning – Eine kleine Nachtmusik
- Edward Wadsworth – Top of the World
- Stanley Warren – Changi Murals
- U Wisara Monument (Rangoon)
- Andrew Wyeth – Public Sale

== Births ==
- January 8 – Sighsten Herrgård, Swedish fashion designer (d.1989)
- January 20 – Jessica Rawson, English art historian
- February 10 – Stephen Gammell, American illustrator
- February 21 – Rafał Olbiński, Polish-born painter and illustrator
- February 22 – Dragoš Kalajić, Serbian modern painter (d. 2005)
- February 28 – Octavio Ocampo, Mexican surrealist painter
- April 24 – Jüri Kerem, Estonian portraitist
- May 1 – Judith Scott, American outsider fiber sculptor (d. 2005)
- May 6 – James Turrell, American installation artist
- June 22 – Gordon Matta-Clark, American situationist, site-specific artist and performance artist (d.1978)
- July 15 – Michael Asher, American conceptual artist and installation artist (d. 2012)
- July 29 – Martha Rosler, American video, photo-text, installation and performance artist
- August 30 – Robert Crumb, American cartoonist
- September 5 – Jerry Wilkerson, American painter (d. 2007)
- September 17 – Gilbert (Proesch), Italian-born artist partnering with George (Passmore)
- October 1 – Sami Mohammad, Kuwaiti sculptor and artist
- November 11 – Dave Cockrum, American comic book artist (d. 2006)
- date unknown
  - Marta Minujin, Argentine conceptual and performance artist
  - Alfredo Rostgaard, Cuban visual artist (d. 2004)
  - Tang Da Wu, Singaporean artist

== Deaths ==
- January 13
  - Xavier Martínez, Mexican-born American painter (b. 1869)
  - Sophie Taeuber-Arp, Swiss geometric abstract painter, sculptor and dancer (accidental carbon monoxide poisoning) (born 1889)
- January 25 – Georges Picard, French decorative artist and illustrator (b. 1857)
- March 8 – Alma del Banco, German painter (suicide) (b. 1862)
- March 9 – Otto Freundlich, German painter and sculptor (killed in Majdanek concentration camp) (b. 1878)
- March 12 – Gustav Vigeland, Norwegian sculptor (b. 1869)
- April 13 – Oskar Schlemmer, German sculptor, painter, designer and choreographer (b. 1888)
- May 25 – Percy Shakespeare, English painter (on active service) (b. 1906)
- June 28 – Pietro Porcelli, Italian-born Australian sculptor (b. 1872)
- c. July 11 – Friedrich Adler, German-Jewish designer (in Auschwitz concentration camp) (b. 1878)
- August 7 – Sarah Purser, Irish portrait painter and stained-glass maker (b. 1848)
- August 9 – Chaïm Soutine, Belarusian Jewish-born French painter (b. 1893)
- August – Adolf Behrman, Polish painter (killed in Białystok Ghetto uprising) (b. 1876)
- September 2 – Marsden Hartley, American Modernist painter (b. 1877)
- c. October 10 – Charlotte Salomon, German-Jewish painter (in Auschwitz concentration camp) (b. 1917)
- October 19 – Camille Claudel, French sculptor and graphic artist (in asylum) (b. 1864)
- November 13 – Maurice Denis, French painter and decorative artist (b. 1870)
- December 22 – Beatrix Potter, English writer and illustrator (b. 1866)

== See also ==
- 1943 in fine arts of the Soviet Union
