= R-Evolution (Cochrane) =

2015 sculpture by Marco Cochrane

- R-Evolution illuminated by colorful lights in Embarcadero Plaza
- Artist: Marco Cochrane
- Year: 2015
- Medium: Steel rod and tubing covered by stainless-steel mesh
- Subject: Feminine strength and liberation
- Dimensions: 14 m (47 ft)
- Weight: 32,000 pounds (15,000 kg)
- Location: San Francisco, California, United States; 37.7947420923447°N 122.39450216195253°W

R-Evolution is the third and final sculpture in Marco Cochrane's series, The Bliss Project. The sculpture was created for and debuted at Burning Man in 2015. The work was displayed at Embarcadero Plaza in San Francisco from April 2025 to October 2026.

== Description and history ==
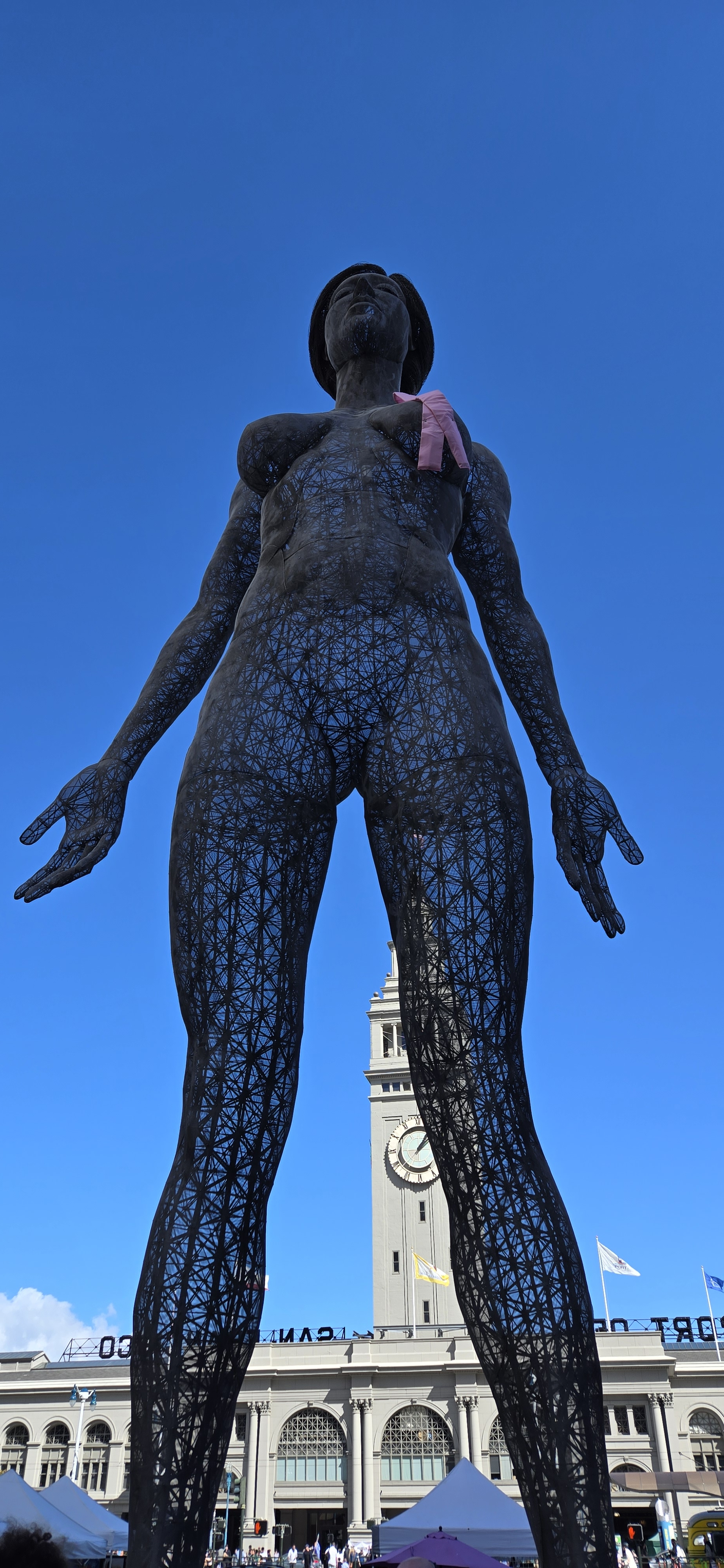
R-Evolution outside of the Ferry Building in San Francisco

R-Evolution is a 47-foot (14 m) tall, 32,000-pound (15,000 kg) sculpture created from steel rod and tubing covered by a stainless-steel mesh. The sculpture features a woman standing in a tadasana pose.

In December 2016, activists applied for a permit to display R-Evolution on the National Mall starting in November 2017 for the "Catharsis on the Mall" event, but the permit was denied over fears the turf would be damaged. Although the sculpture was too tall for temporary installations on the Mall, a height variance was issued and later revoked. Undaunted, the group instead applied to exhibit a 26-foot (7.9 m)-tall composite photograph of 27 naked women holding the same pose, which a spokeswoman called "a healing image and it's about making women feel safe in their environments."

== See also ==
- 2015 in art
- Truth is Beauty (2013)
