= Jazz Band (Dirty Style Blues) =

1944 painting by Jean Dubuffet

- Artist: Jean Dubuffet
- Year: 1944
- Medium: oil on canvas
- Dimensions: 97 cm × 130 cm (38 in × 51 in)
- Location: Musée National d'Art Moderne, Paris

Jazz Band (Dirty Style Blues) is an oil on canvas painting by French artist Jean Dubuffet, from 1944. It depicts the six members of a jazz orchestra. It is held at the Musée National d'Art Moderne, in Paris.

== History and description ==
Dubuffett was at the time a great admirer of American jazz, in particular of Louis Armstrong. He created three Jazz inspired paintings in December 1944. He felt particularly inspired by their improvisational style of music to create works that could be seen as their equivalent in painting, like he stated in a 1963 letter. The six musicians shown in this painting are all African-American and play several different instruments. They are deliberately depicted in a very primitive and childlike style, that also seems influenced by African art. A large piano stands behind four of the musicians and is being played by the musician at the left. At the right, another one plays the cello.

Sophie Duplaix states that in this painting "the superposition of layers of color and their unexpected mixture, the furious incision of the material that brings out the underlying hues, the warm dominants that unfold in subtle combinations, are all transpositions of a sound universe that breaks with the conventions of classical music, familiar to Dubuffet, who had assiduously practiced the piano since childhood."

Dubuffet took an interest to all forms of non-Western music as an inspiration for his artwork, but only in 1960-1961 he would claim to have achieved an equivalence between both forms of art, when he created his own Musical Experiences (1961), largely experimental musical compositions.
