= Kerem (disambiguation) =

Kerem is a Turkish male given name

Kerem may also refer to:

- Kerem (surname)
- Kerem a Turkish-language opera by Ahmet Adnan Saygun
- Kerem, a component of Hebrew placenames literally meaning "vineyard"
