= Kerem (surname) =

Kerem is a surname of multiple origins: Estonian and Hebrew (Hebrew: כרם, "vineyard"). Notable people with the surname include:

- Batsheva Kerem
- Dana Kerem (born 1986), Israeli footballer
- Jüri Kerem (1943-1993), Estonian caricaturist and portraitist
- Mihkel Kerem (born 1981), Estonian composer and violinist
