= OSIsoft =

American software company, 1980 to 2021

OSIsoft, LLC

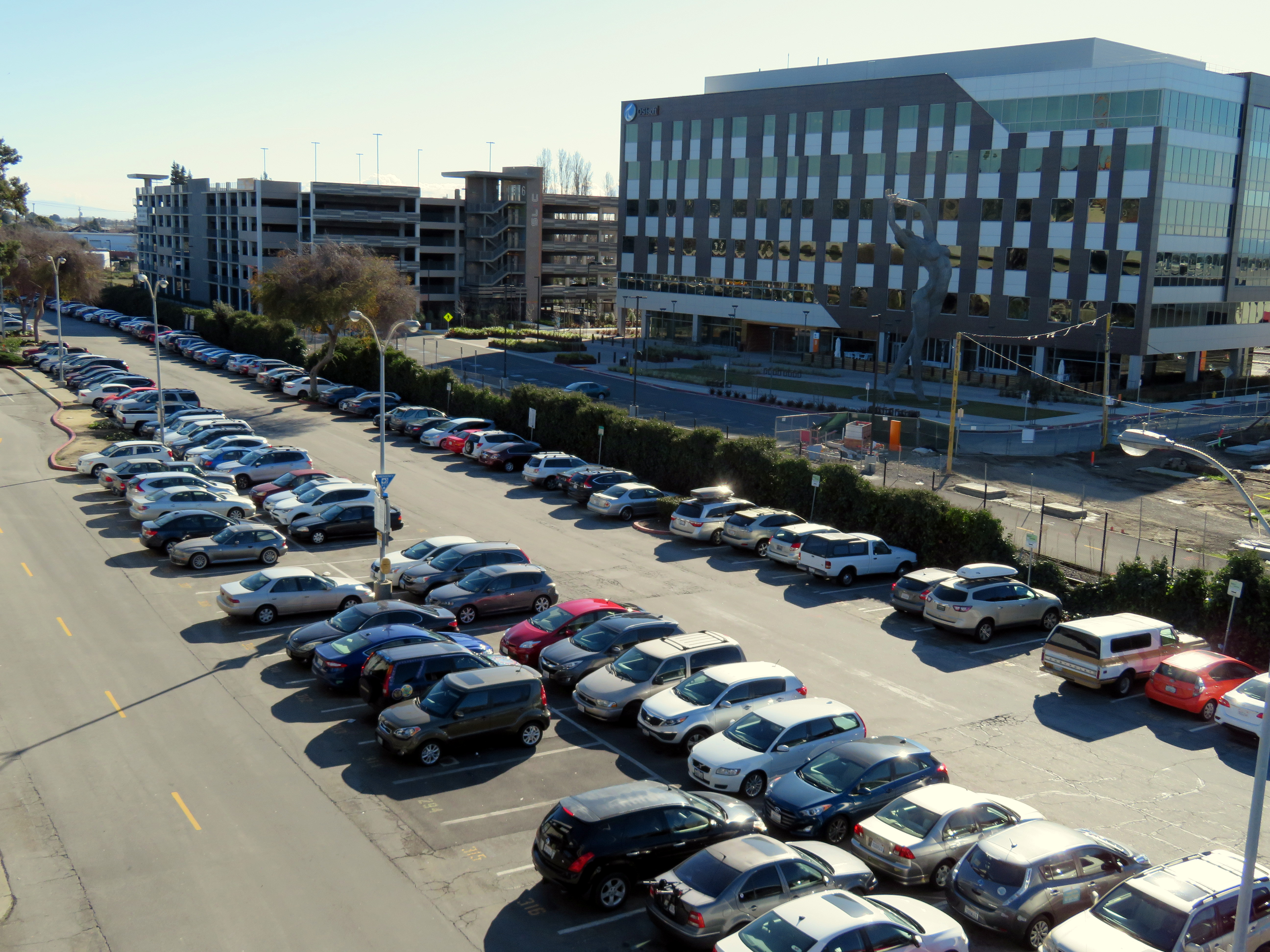
- OSIsoft building on the San Leandro Tech Campus, adjacent to San Leandro BART
- Type: Private
- Industry: Application software
- Founded: 1980
- Founder: J. Patrick Kennedy
- Defunct: March 19, 2021; 5 years ago
- Fate: Acquired
- Successor: Aveva
- Headquarters: San Leandro, California, USA
- Key people: J. Patrick Kennedy (CEO); Michael Siemer (President)
- Products: PI System · PI ProcessBook · PI Server · PI DataLink · PI Vision
- Number of employees: >1300 (2016)
- Website: osisoft.com

OSIsoft, LLC was a manufacturer of application software for real-time data management, called the PI System. Founded in 1980, OSIsoft was privately held and headquartered in San Leandro, California. In August 2020, it was announced that the UK-based production company AVEVA agreed to buy OSIsoft in a deal worth $5 billion; the purchase was subsequently completed on 19 March 2021 for a final consideration of £3,831.4 million.

== History ==
On January 5, 2011, OSIsoft announced a $135 million minority investment by Technology Crossover Ventures and Kleiner Perkins Caufield & Byers.

Lit San Leandro, a business associated with OSIsoft, has built a fiber-optic network in the city of San Leandro, linking high tech and other businesses. They have also proposed providing a high-speed fiber-optic network for the industrial corridor in nearby Hayward.
