= The Cow with the Subtile Nose =

Painting by Jean Dubuffet

- Artist: Jean Dubuffet
- Year: 1954
- Medium: oil and enamel on canvas
- Dimensions: 116 cm × 89 cm (46 in × 35 in)
- Location: Museum of Modern Art, New York

The Cow with the Subtile Nose is an oil and enamel painting on canvas by French painter Jean Dubuffet, created in 1954. It is held in the Museum of Modern Art, in New York.

== History ==
Starting in July 1954 Dubuffet often went to Durtol, a small village near Clermont-Ferrand, where his wife lived for health reasons. He set up a workshop there and worked on rural scenes, as he had in 1943–1944. He said: "I took great pleasure in looking at the cows for a long time as I had done in the past and then drawing them from memory, or sometimes even, but much more exceptionally, from life."

During this period he created a series of paintings of cows, including The Cow with a Subtile Nose.

Also from July 1954, Dubuffet experimented with a new painting technique: lacquered paint. This very fluid, quick-drying industrial paint, called "four-hour enamel", when drying gives a network of cracks when used in combination with oil paint. Dubuffet then completed the painting with a small brush. He said this was "highlighting the tiny networks of veins and ocellations caused by the presence of two enemy paintings.

The style of the painting is deliberately primitive; the large cow occupies most of the canvas, in a greenish background, which seems to represent her pasture. The cow appears unusually large, in a brownish-yellow colour. Her eyes and nose seems also very big. The title of the painting is an ironic reference to that particular feature.

This painting is the only of the Cows series that appeared in Dubuffet's first retrospective held at the Fondation Maeght, in 1985.

== Provenance ==
The painting was acquired by the Museum of Modern Art in New York in 1956.
