= La Chiffonnière =

Sculpture by Jean Dubuffet by San Francisco, California, U.S.

- Rag Woman (English)
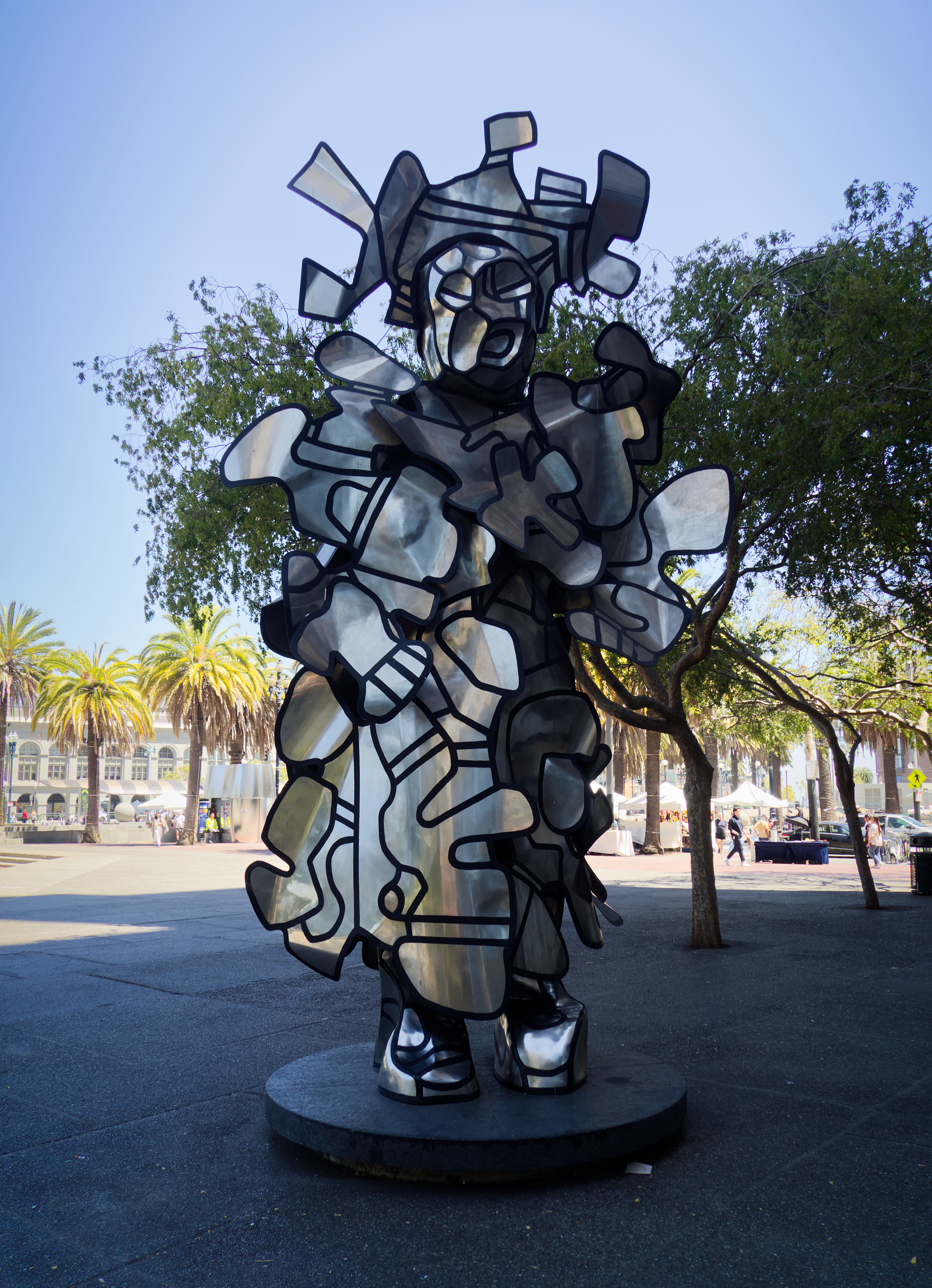
- La Chiffonnière at its San Francisco installation
- Artist: Jean Dubuffet
- Year: 1978
- Medium: Stainless steel sculpture
- Dimensions: 6.7 m (22 ft)
- Location: San Francisco, California, U.S.; 37°47′41″N 122°23′42.7″W

La Chiffonnière (French for Rag Woman) is a stainless steel sculpture by French artist Jean Dubuffet, installed in Embarcadero Plaza in the Financial District of San Francisco, California. The 22-foot (6.7 m) tall, 4,500-pound (2,000 kg) artwork was conceived in 1972 and completed in 1978. It was displayed in Manhattan's Doris C. Freedman Plaza from March 20 to December 12, 1979.

== See also ==
- 1978 in art
