= Marco Cochrane =

American sculptor (born 1962)

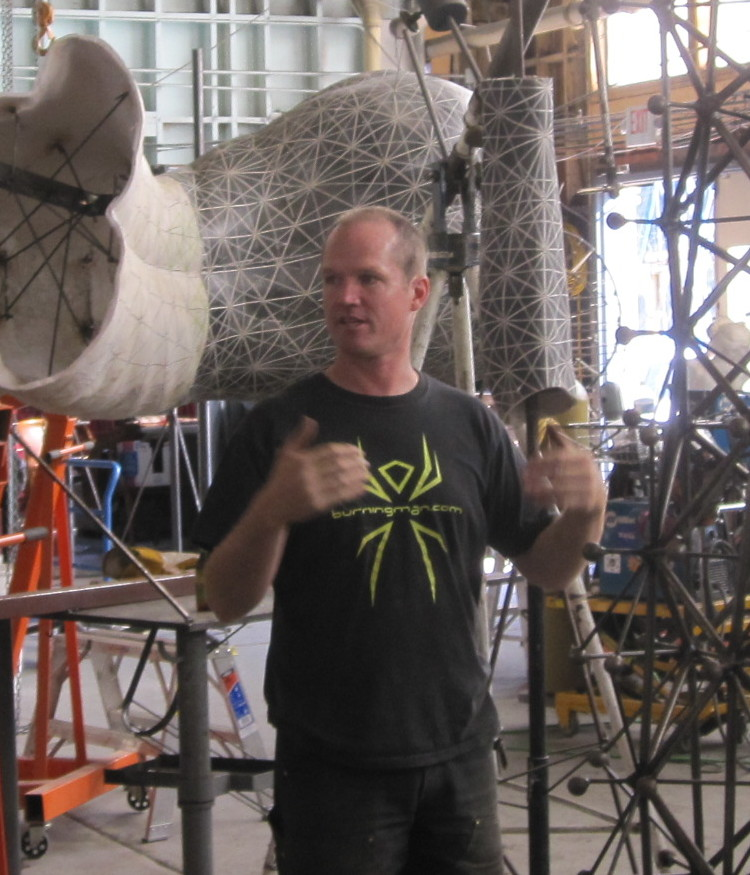
- Marco Cochrane (2011)
- Notable work: The Bliss Project (trilogy)
- Website: marcocochranesculpture.net

Marco Cochrane (born 1962) is an American sculptor born in Venice, Italy, best known for his large-scale steel sculptures of nude women.

== Early and personal life ==
Cochrane was born in Venice to American artists and raised in Berkeley, California. When he was seven years old, a friend, then aged nine, was abducted and raped; Cochrane recalls "[m]y mom told me about it in way too much gory detail. It really shocked me," adding he was also surprised when "nobody did anything — and nobody ever talked about it again" and wondered "if he had realized she was a person, he wouldn't have done it."

Cochrane is self-taught in sculpture

== The Bliss Project ==
What I see missing in the world is an appreciation and respect for feminine energy and power that results when women are free and safe. It seems obvious to me that feminine energy is being suppressed and that this must change. If we are to find real, lasting solutions to the problems facing humanity, men and women must be able to work together as equals. Bliss Dance is intended to focus attention on this issue.

— Marco Cochrane, Feb 2016 press release announcing installation of Bliss Dance at The Park

Bliss Dance, Truth is Beauty and R-Evolution collectively form The Bliss Project, a trilogy of steel sculptures. The model for each piece was the singer and dancer Deja Solis. Cochrane met Solis in 2006 and asked her to model for a work in progress. During their fifth collaboration, Solis advanced the idea for the pose that would be sculpted as Bliss Dance.

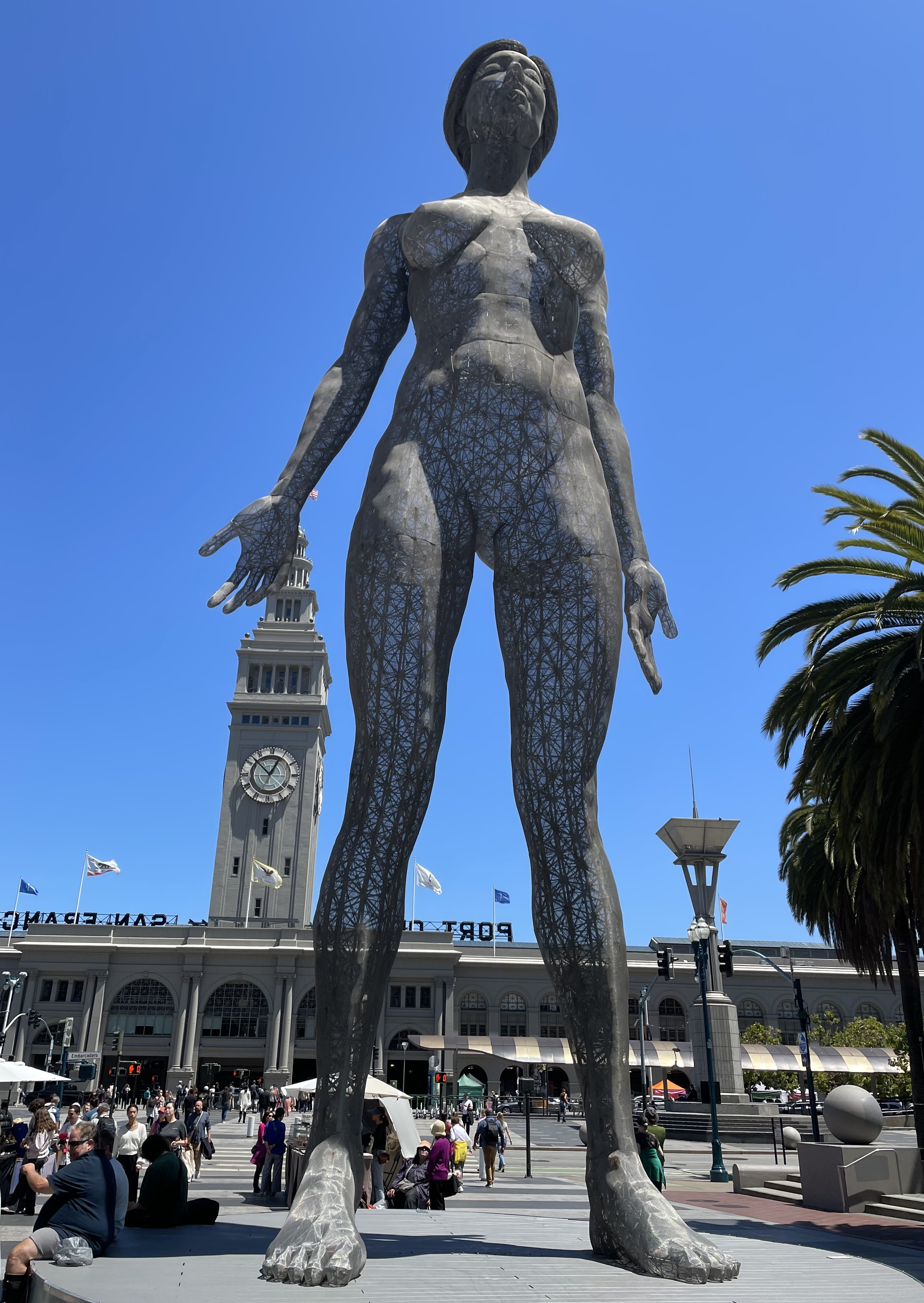
R-Evolution on view at Embarcadero Plaza

A three-stage process was used to create each final piece:

1. Cochrane sculpts Solis in clay as she holds the pose, and then casts a 3/4-scale plaster model from the clay
2. Cochrane sculpts an intermediate clay model enlarged by 3× over the plaster model using a pantograph
3. Cochrane and volunteers weld a final steel model enlarged by 3× over the intermediate clay using a pantograph

The finished sculptures use steel rod and tubing connected by steel balls for the structure, finished with a stainless steel mesh skin lit by LEDs.

The first piece, entitled Bliss Dance (2010), reaches 40 feet (12 m) in height and, after being introduced at Burning Man, was given a location on San Francisco's Treasure Island, where it remained until May 18, 2015. Bliss Dance later moved permanently to The Park, an entertainment venue near T-Mobile Arena on the Las Vegas Strip, which opened on April 4, 2016. It weighs more than 7,500 pounds (3,400 kg).

Truth is Beauty (2013) which rises to 55 feet (17 m) and weighs 13,000 pounds (5,900 kg), was first shown at Burning Man in 2013. A smaller scale piece by Cochrane will be showcased at the Renwick Gallery. It was a response to the rape and abduction of a childhood friend, and moved to a permanent location at the San Leandro Tech Campus in the fall of 2016, where it is visible from the San Leandro BART station. The piece was chosen by developer Westlake Urban to fulfill the city's requirement to spend one percent of the project budget on art.

R-Evolution (2015), the third and final sculpture in The Bliss Project series, debuted at Burning Man in 2015 and has not yet found a permanent home. In 2019, the Union Square Business Improvement District studied the possibility of bringing R-Evolution to Hallidie Plaza, the entrance to Powell Street. From April 2025 to October 2026, the sculpture was on view at Embarcadero Plaza, San Francisco.
