= Abraham Lincoln Brigade Monument =

Art installation in San Francisco, California, U.S.

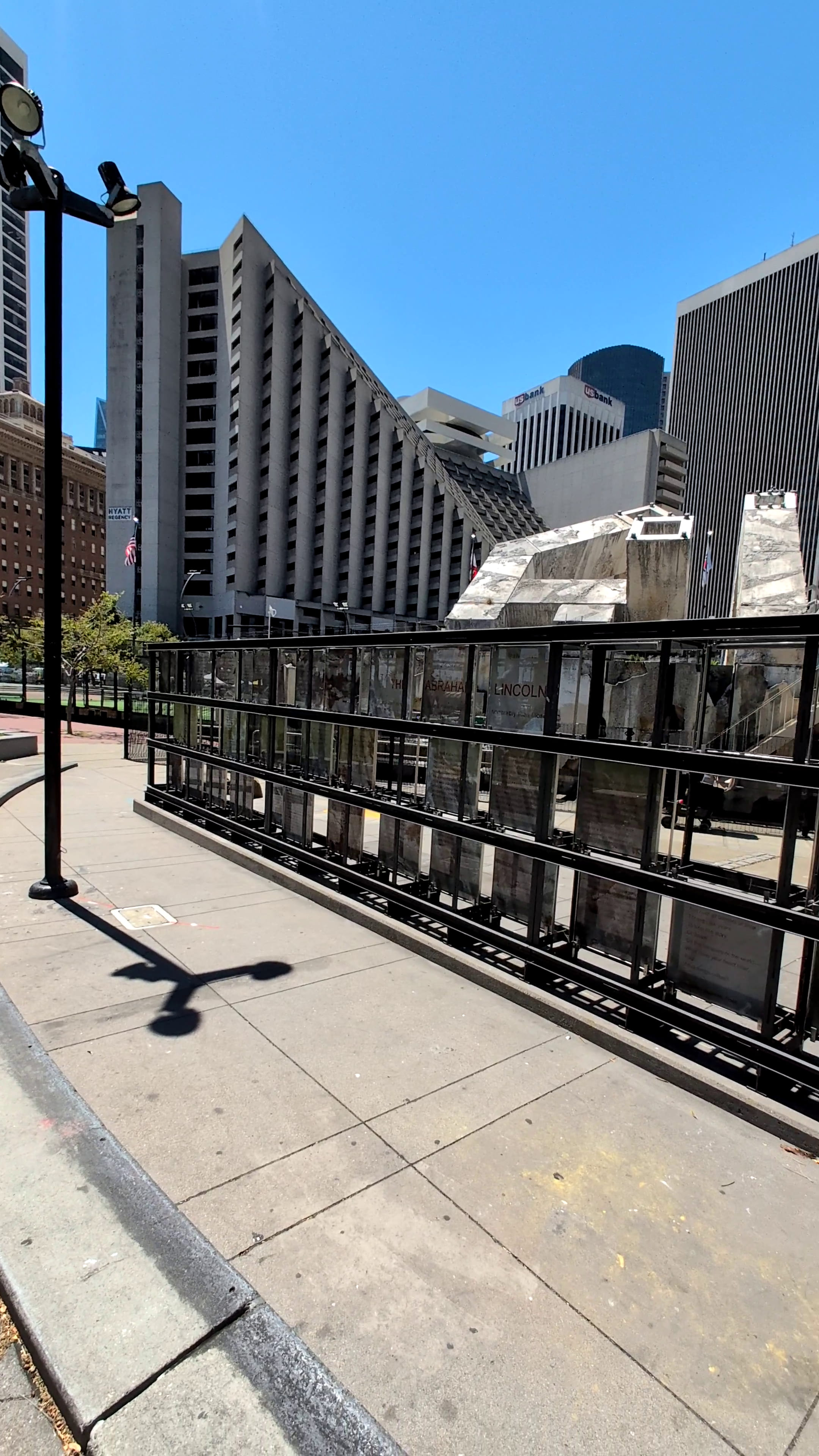
- Artist: Ann Chamberlain, Walter Hood
- Completion date: March 30, 2008
- Medium: Steel, Onyx, Concrete
- Subject: Lincoln Battalion, XV International Brigade
- Dimensions: 2.4 m × 0.6 m × 11.9 m (8 ft × 1.9 ft × 39 ft)
- Location: Embarcadero Plaza; San Francisco, California, United States; 37.79551342820834°N 122.39515003159°W
- Owner: San Francisco Arts Commission
- Accession: 2008.3
- Website: embarcaderoplaza.com/tour/abraham-lincoln-brigade-monument

The Abraham Lincoln Brigade Monument is a steel and onyx art installation in Embarcadero Plaza in San Francisco's Financial District, in the U.S. state of California. The monument was designed by Ann Chamberlain and Walter J. Hood with US$400,000 in funding from the Abraham Lincoln Brigade Archives to honor the Lincoln Battalion and XV International Brigade, formed to fight for the Spanish Republic during the Spanish Civil War. It was dedicated on March 30, 2008, and is part of the San Francisco Arts Commission collection.

One side of the monument's panels shows portraits of the volunteers. The other side contains annotated maps of the front lines between 1936 and 1938, as well as quotes from volunteers Abe Osheroff, Dave Smith, Alvah Bessie, Edwin Rolfe, Frederick Martin, Ruth Davidow, Robert Colodny, and Steve Nelson. Additional panels contain words about that period from historians, labor organizers, writers, and musicians, such as Dolores Ibarruri, Albert Camus, Ernest Hemingway, and Paul Robeson.

Intermittent repairs have been made in the decade since the monument was installed. In August 2018, the onyx stone panels were removed and taken offsite for repair, due to a combination of design issues and neglect. The Monument was restored by May 2020.
