= San Leandro Tech Campus =

Technology park in San Leandro, California

Coordinates: 37.721565°N 122.161957°W

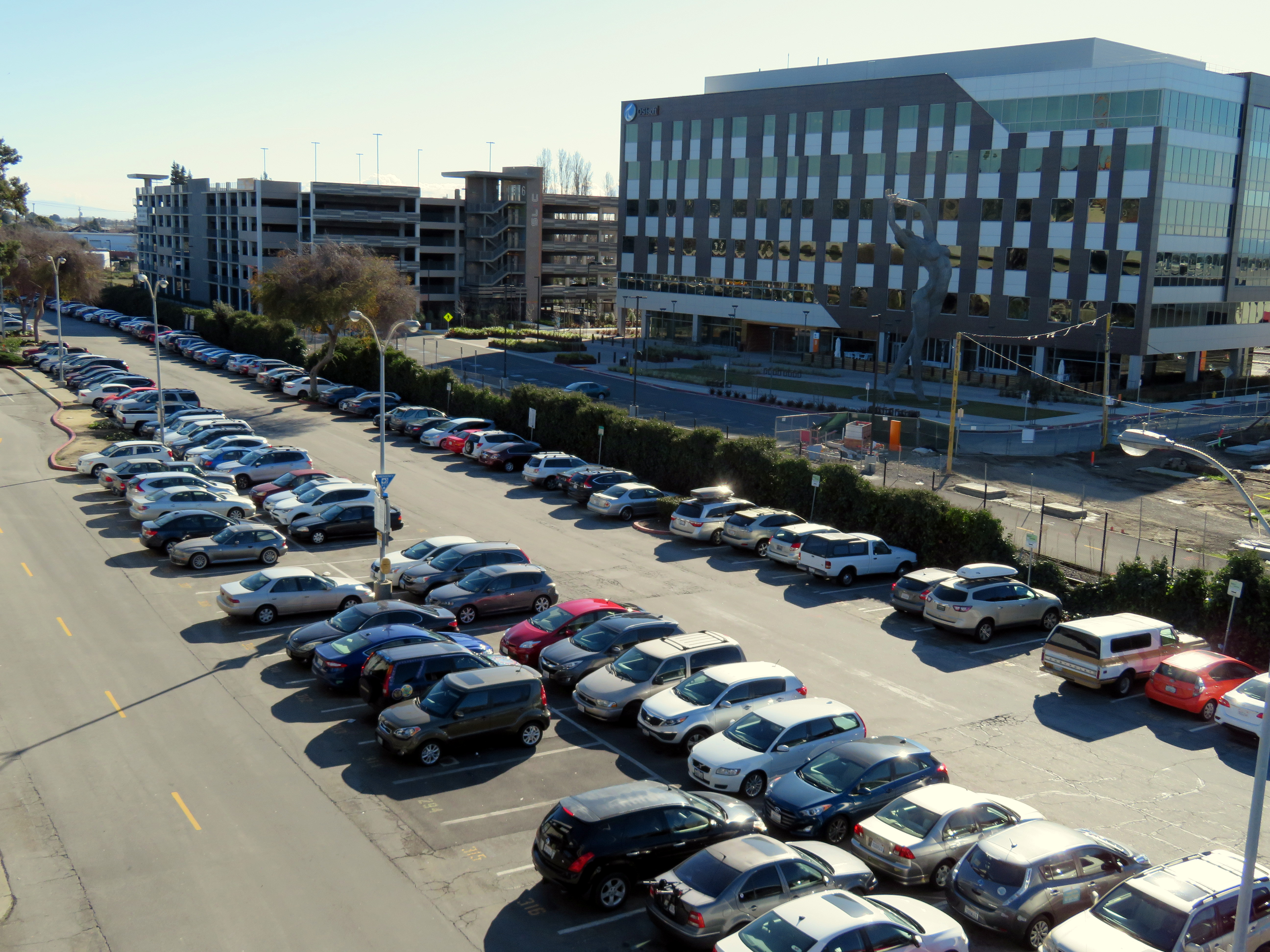
Parking lot at San Leandro BART, with the OSIsoft building on the San Leandro Tech Campus across the street

The San Leandro Tech Campus is a business park being constructed by Westlake Development Partners LLC in downtown San Leandro, California, near the San Leandro BART station. Construction of Phase 1 of the project began in 2014, and was completed in 2016. The primary tenant of the first phase of construction is OSIsoft, a software company based in San Leandro. Phase 2 of the project is expected to be completed in 2019 with Ghirardelli Chocolate Company as the lead tenant.

The site is the permanent location for the sculpture Truth is Beauty by Marco Cochrane. The sculpture generated some controversy, as it is a large (55 ft (17 m) tall) nude outdoor sculpture, albeit on private property.
