= Embarcadero Plaza =

Park in San Francisco, California

- Justin Herman Plaza
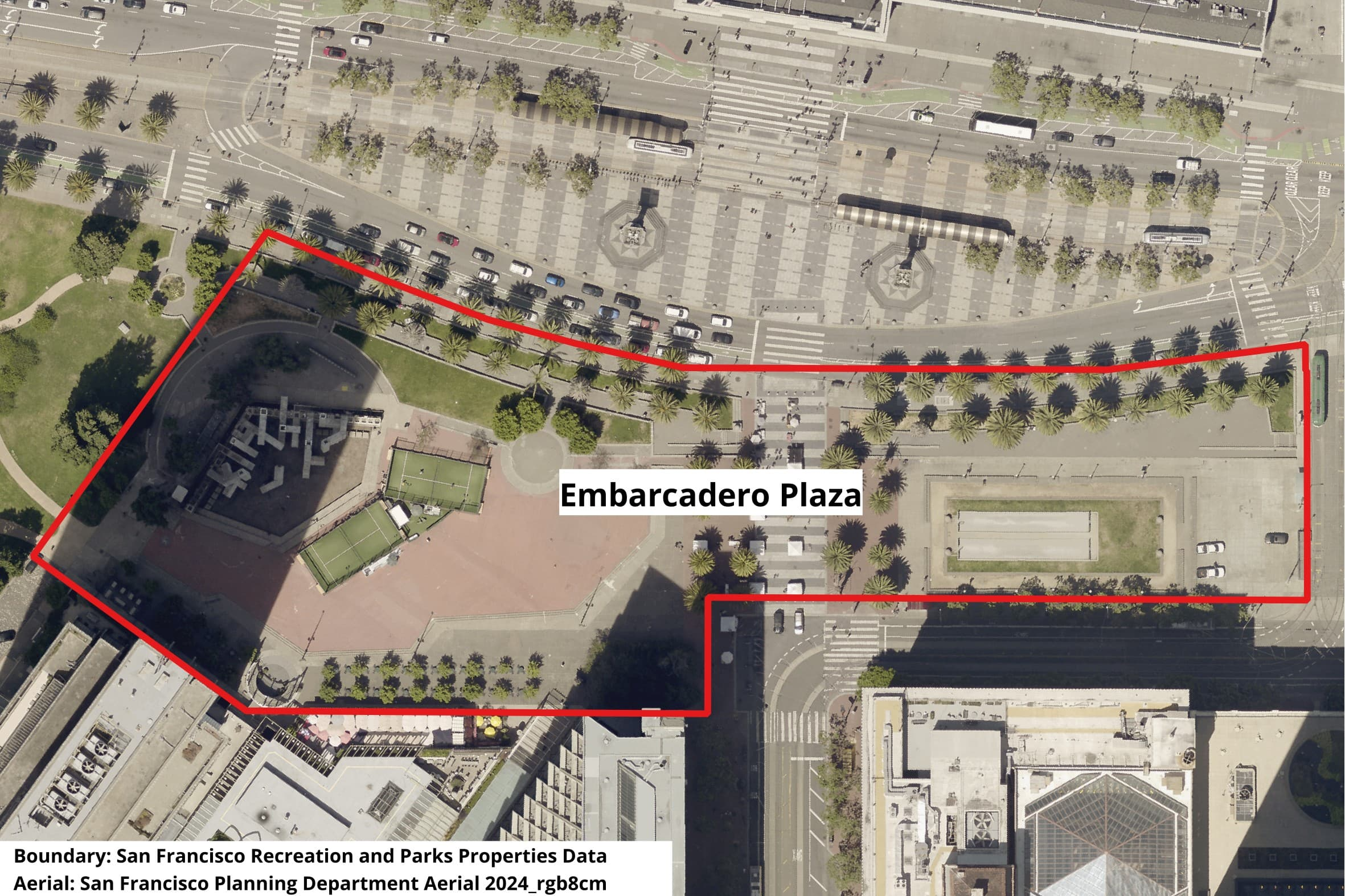
- 2024 aerial of Embarcadero Plaza
- Interactive map of Embarcadero Plaza
- Type: Urban park
- Location: San Francisco, California
- Coordinates: 37.7949°N 122.3948°W
- Area: 4.1 acres (1.7 ha; 0.0064 mi^{2}; 0.017 km^{2})
- Created: 1972
- Designer: Lawrence Halprin
- Owner: San Francisco Recreation & Parks Department
- Operator: San Francisco Recreation & Parks Department
- Open: All year
- Public transit: BART and Muni, Embarcadero station
- Website: embarcaderoplaza.com

Embarcadero Plaza, previously known as Justin Herman Plaza from its opening in 1972 until 2017, is a 4.1-acre (1.7 ha) plaza near the intersection of Market Street and The Embarcadero in San Francisco's Financial District, in the U.S. state of California. It was completed in 1972 and is owned and operated by the San Francisco Recreation & Parks Department. The plaza is composed of two halves: Embarcadero Plaza North and Embarcadero Plaza South.

Embarcadero Plaza is bordered by Sue Bierman Park on the north, The Embarcadero on the northeast, Don Chee Way busway on the southeast, a combination of Steuart Street, Market Street, and Embarcadero Center on the southwest, and a combination of Embarcadero Center and Clay Street on the west.

Embarcadero Plaza North contains the Abraham Lincoln Brigade Monument, the Vaillancourt Fountain, a sunken brick hardscape, and temporary padel courts. Embarcadero Plaza South contains R-Evolution (Cochrane), bocce courts, the Don Chee Way hardscape, and a crosswalk.

== Design ==
The Ferry Building Park could be a great open space with canals, lagoons, and fountains that would revive the marine flavor by actually bringing the Bay back into the area. The atmosphere of European ports could be injected with handsome paving, sidewalk cafes, and fine restaurants. The freeway should be painted dark, and large trees should be planted to suppress its sight and its sounds. Difficult as all this may be, establish the Ferry Building Park area as a vibrant, alive, colorful place, used by day and at night, and it will send a tingle up the spine of Market Street.

— Halprin, Carter, and Rockrise, What to do About Market Street (1962)

The design of Embarcadero Plaza is credited to Don Carter (principal-in-charge) with help from Mario J. Ciampi and John Bolles. The original concept was devised by Lawrence Halprin, who described five distinct districts of Market Street in the 1962 report What to do About Market Street starting at the Embarcadero and ending at Van Ness. In retrospect, Halprin's vision for Market was described as a "pedestrian-oriented series of linked civic spaces" which were later realized as the open spaces running from Embarcadero Plaza (in the northeast) to UN Plaza in the southwest. Halprin described an early concept for what he called Ferry Building Park in the 1962 What to do About Market Street report, proposing to bring San Francisco Bay and the original harbor closer to Market, as "the [Embarcadero] Freeway and the Ferry building have created an impenetrable barrier, at street level, to one of San Francisco's most priceless assets – its marine setting" and offering ways to minimize the visual and aural impact of the double-decked freeway.

The controversial Vaillancourt Fountain dominates the northeast end of the plaza. The large plaza could accommodate large crowds, and the roaring fountain was designed to drown out noise from the Embarcadero Freeway, which was completed in 1959 and ran along the east side of the plaza from its opening in 1972 until the freeway was torn down in 1991.

Map of Embarcadero Plaza as of July 2025

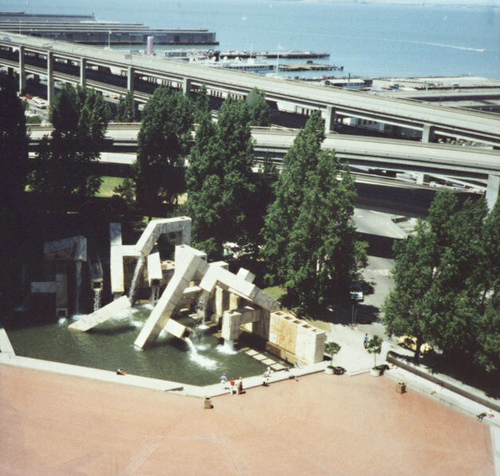
View of Vaillancourt Fountain and Embarcadero Plaza North in 1988, matching initial 1972 configuration. Note double-deck Embarcadero Freeway separating plaza from waterfront.

== History ==
=== Early history and construction ===
The space occupied by Embarcadero Plaza was acquired in the 1950s and 1960s by the San Francisco Redevelopment Agency (SFRA). The space had been previously used for private buildings and parking before acquisition. The plaza was part of the Golden Gateway Redevelopment Project run by SFRA.

The designers of the plaza include Lawrence Halprin & Associates in conjunction with Mario Ciampi & Associates and John Bolles & Associates. The SFRA began construction of the plaza in the late 1960s, with construction finishing in 1972. The Vaillancourt Fountain, located on the Northern end of the plaza, was finished in 1971.

While it was referred to as “Embarcadero Plaza” during design and construction, it was renamed Justin Herman Plaza in 1974 in honor of M. Justin Herman, executive director of the SFRA from 1959 to 1971, who died suddenly in 1971.

=== Updates and changing use ===
The sculpture La Chiffonnière was installed in the northern portion of the plaza, closer to Market Street in 1981. In 1983, the plaza was renovated with tiered seating, expanded steps, and an outdoor stage platform.

The 1989 Loma Prieta earthquake caused significant damage to the adjacent Embarcadero Freeway, leading to the freeway’s demolition in 1991, causing the surrounding area to open up. Around the same time in the late 1980s, the plaza became a world-renowned skateboarding destination during the rise of modern street skateboarding.

Further renovations to the plaza were discussed beginning in the early 1990s, with more modest renovation taking place between 1998 and 2001 in parallel to the creation of Harry Bridges Plaza.

=== Further updates ===
In 2008, the Abraham Lincoln Brigade Monument was installed between the Vaillancourt Fountain and the Embarcadero. The monument is dedicated to the Americans who volunteered to fight fascism in Spain during the 1930s. The monument was subsequently repaired between 2018 and 2020.

In 2010, two bocce ball courts were installed in the lawn in the southern portion of the plaza with private funding and labor.

Embarcadero Plaza became a contributor to the Market Street Cultural Landscape District in 2016, which is a historic resource listed in the California Register of Historical Resources.

=== Renaming the plaza ===
In 2017, San Francisco Supervisor Aaron Peskin introduced a resolution to rename the site Embarcadero Plaza, citing Herman's role in displacing poor and minority residents from the Western Addition, Fillmore, Chinatown, and South of Market neighborhoods while presiding over the San Francisco Redevelopment Agency. The San Francisco Board of Supervisors passed the resolution unanimously on September 19, 2017.

The San Francisco Recreation & Parks Commission voted 4–2 to remove Justin Herman's name on November 16, 2017. An earlier vote in October ended in a 3–3 tie. The name has remained Embarcadero Plaza since 2017.

=== Recent changes ===
In 2023, temporary, privately owned padel courts were added to the northern section of the plaza. They remain located on the brick portion of the plaza near the fountain.

In April 2025, a temporary statue by Marco Cochrane, R-Evolution, was installed in the southern section of the plaza.

== Usage ==
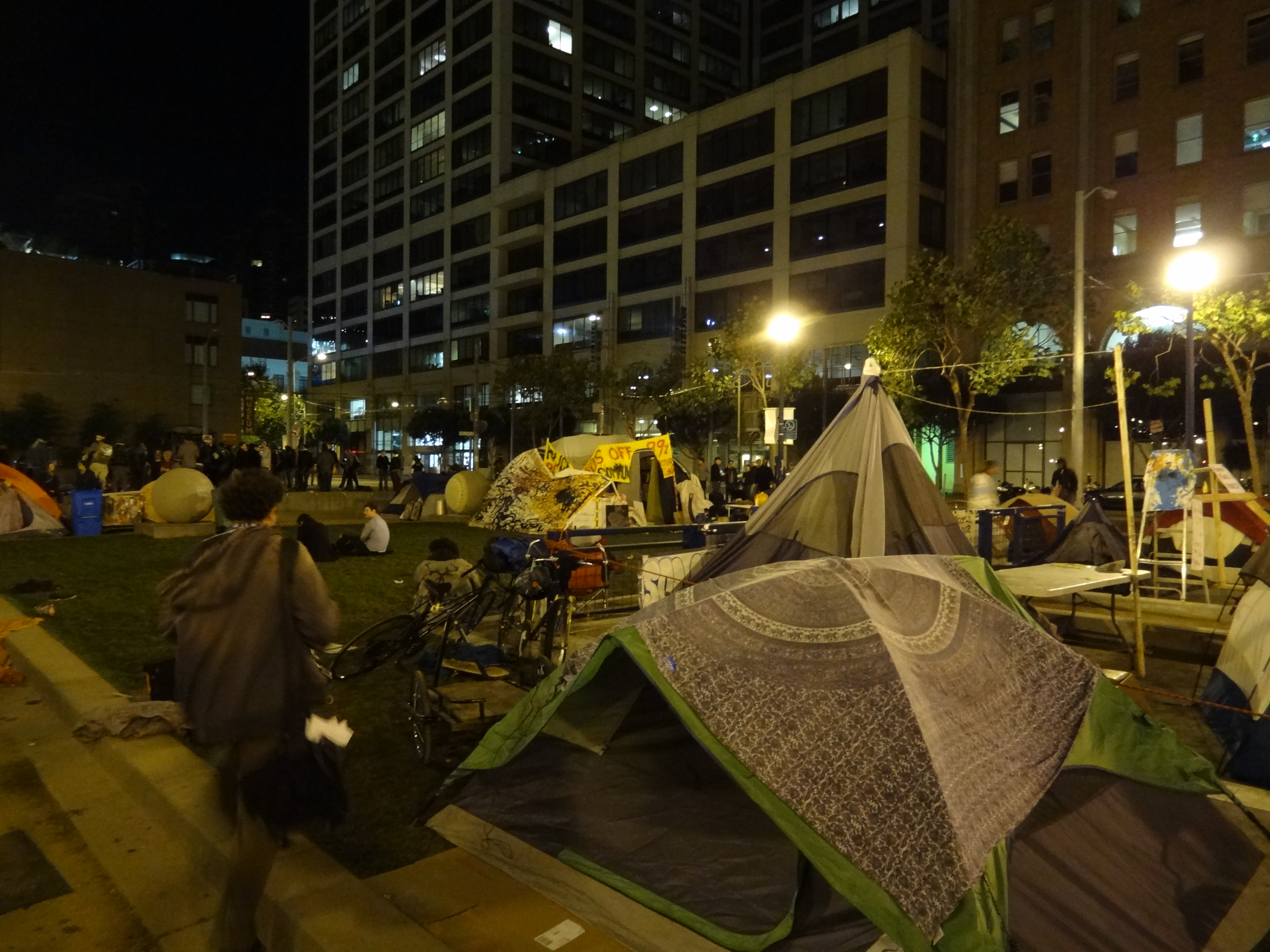
Occupy San Francisco encampment (2011)

The plaza is frequented by nearby office workers on lunch break and by families with small children. Free daytime concerts occur frequently in the summer, and an ice skating rink is set up for winter months. In 1987, during The Joshua Tree Tour, U2 held a free concert in Justin Herman Plaza to "Save the Yuppies" following the Black Monday financial crisis in October. During the finale of the impromptu concert, Bono spray-painted graffiti on Vaillancourt Fountain, for which he was fined. Shortly after the release of their second album, The Bends, Radiohead held a free concert in Justin Herman Plaza on April 3, 1995.

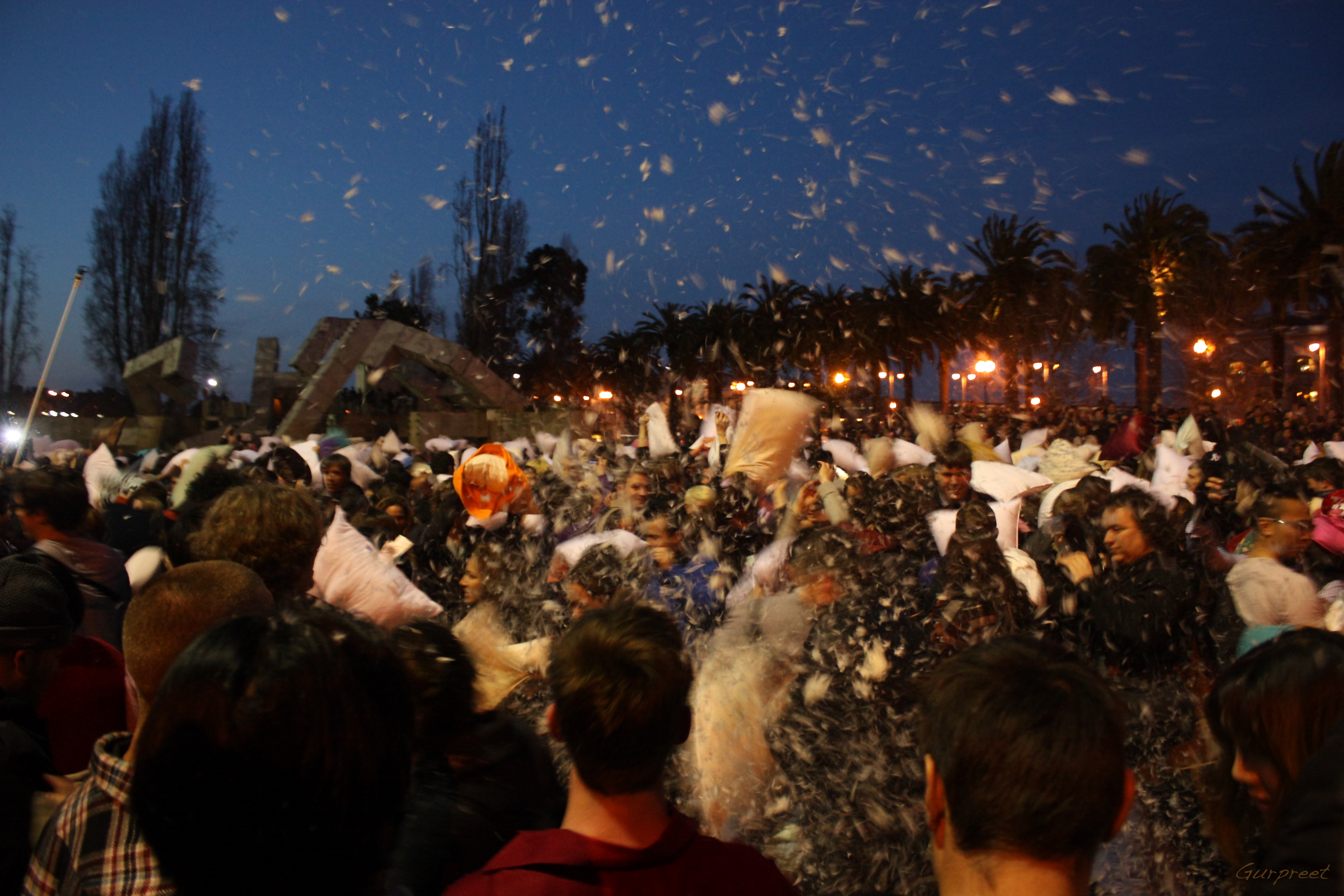
Great San Francisco Pillow Fight (2012)

During the early 1990s, the plaza was better known as EMB, one of the world's premier street skateboarding sites. Formal athletic ceremonies and rallies have also occurred in the plaza, including the retirement of Joe Montana (1995), attended by an estimated 25,000 people; the commemoration of Barry Bonds becoming the all-time home run leader (2007); and as the site of Super Bowl City, a "fan village" for attendees of Super Bowl 50 (2016) at Levi's Stadium in distant Santa Clara. Because of its size, the plaza is also frequently used for political rallies, including the Occupy San Francisco protest which took over the plaza for several months in 2011.

=== Recurring events ===
The monthly Critical Mass bicycle rides have started from the plaza since September 1992. Since 2006, on Valentine's Day, the plaza is the site of the Great San Francisco Pillow Fight, an unsponsored annual pillow fight flash mob.

== Maintenance ==
Once construction was completed, long-term maintenance of Embarcadero Plaza was handed over to San Francisco city agencies, including San Francisco Recreation & Parks Department and San Francisco Department of Public Works.

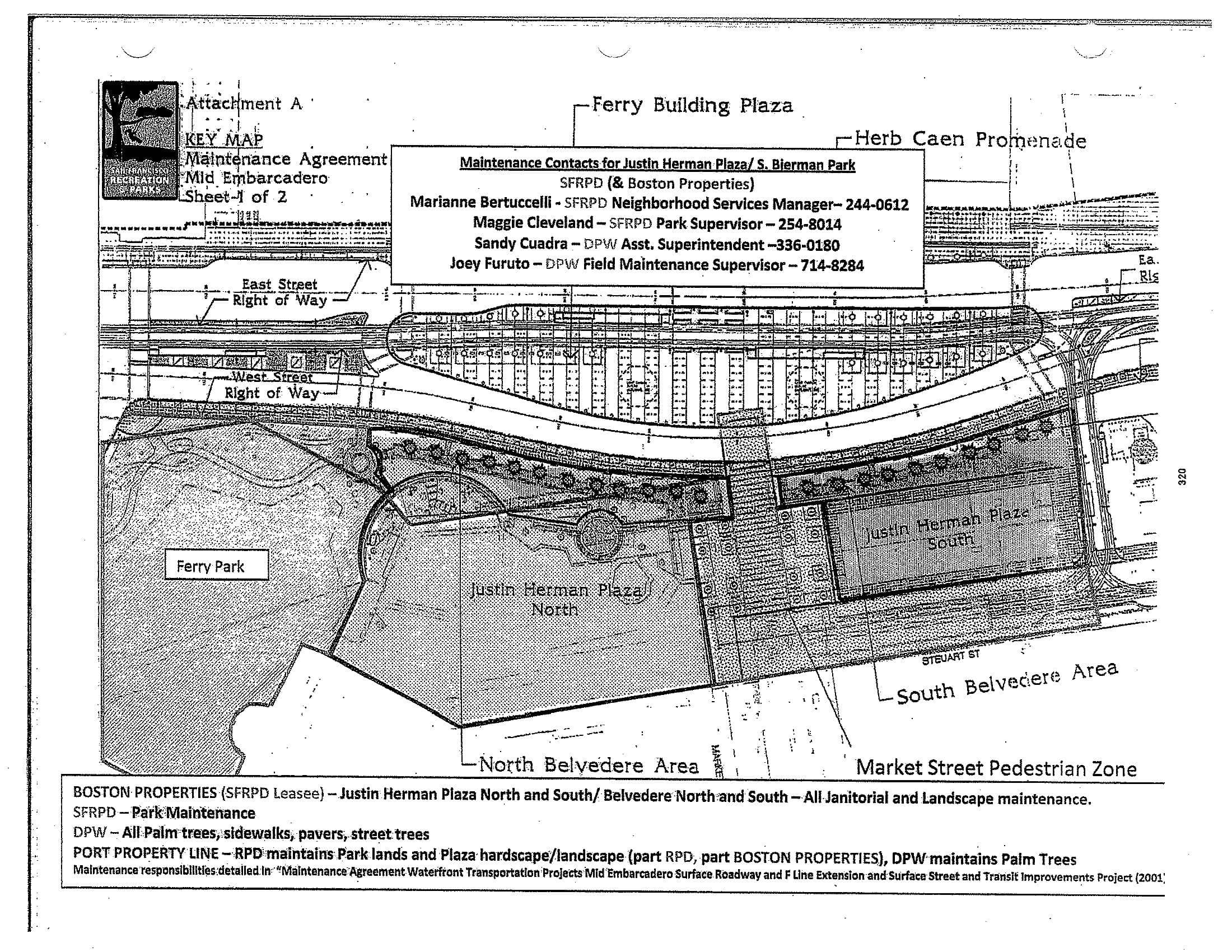
Justin Herman Plaza Maintenance Map September 2010 Page 1 from San Francisco Board of Supervisors Board of Supervisors File #101070.

Since the late 1970s, San Francisco has shared the maintenance of Embarcadero Plaza with the private owners of adjacent Embarcadero Center, including Embarcadero Center, Ltd. and BXP, Inc.

[...]

WHEREAS, The Embarcadero Center repaired the pumps and restored the Vaillancourt Fountain at M. Justin Herman Plaza, expending $150,000 to make it operable; and

WHEREAS, The Embarcadero Center has assumed the complete maintenance responsibilities of M. Justin Herman Plaza; and

[...]

NOW, THEREFORE, BE IT RESOLVED, That the members of the Recreation and Park Commission do hereby extend to Embarcadero Center, and particularly to its Executive Director, Mr. James R. Bronkema, this formal expression of the Commission's profound gratitude, and, be it

FURTHER RESOLVED, That a suitable copy of this Resolution to the Embarcadero Center be prepared for presentation to Mr. James R. Bronkema who set a noble example to the entire community by being the first major corporation to "Adopt A park" in San Francisco.

— San Francisco Recreation & Parks Department, San Francisco Recreation & Park Commission - 1979 Minutes, page 659-661

This arrangement, where maintenance of Embarcadero Plaza is shared amongst city agencies and private entities, was reaffirmed throughout the intervening years.

In 2011-2012, a City and County of San Francisco Civil Grand Jury found that "A complicating factor is that a host of public and private entities manage the Embarcadero and adjacent public spaces. Rec & Park, the San Francisco Port Commission, the Department of Public Works, the Real Estate Division, and Boston Properties all claim interests in Justin Herman Plaza and its surrounds."

In late 2025, the maintenance arrangement was publicized in the context of a proposed renovation of Embarcadero Plaza and nearby Sue Bierman Park.
