= Truth is Beauty =

2013 sculpture by Marco Cochrane

Coordinates: 37.7214°N 122.1616°W

- Artist: Marco Cochrane
- Year: 2013
- Type: Sculpture
- Location: San Leandro

Truth is Beauty is a 55-foot (17 m) sculpture by Marco Cochrane. The sculpture is lit from the inside by more than 3,000 LED lights. It is part of a series of three large-scale steel sculptures of nude women by Cochrane, Bliss Dance (2010), Truth is Beauty (2013) and R-Evolution (2015). It was first exhibited at the 2013 Burning Man, then the Las Vegas Strip, and is now at permanent display at the San Leandro Tech Campus in California.
