= Alfredo Rostgaard =

Cuban artist

- Born: 1943; Guantánamo, Cuba
- Died: December 27, 2004 (aged 60–61); Havana, Cuba
- Known for: Graphic design, Cuban film, political posters
- Style: Pop art, psychedelic art

Alfredo Rostgaard (1943 – December 27, 2004) was a Cuban graphic designer and artist. He was one of the leading designers of revolutionary Cuban film and political posters through his work for the Instituto Cubano del Arte e Industria Cinematográficos (ICAIC), Organisation for Solidarity with the People of Africa, Asia and Latin America, Casa de las Americas, Comisión de Orientación Revolucionaria and other Cuban agencies.

== Early life and education ==
Born in Guantánamo in 1943, Rostgaard studied at the José Joaquín Tejada school of art in Santiago de Cuba.

== Art ==
He is one of the most prolific of the revolutionary designers that contributed to Cuba's massive output of posters during the mid 60s to mid 70s. In 1963 he was appointed artistic director of Mella, the magazine of the union of young communists. Rostgaard was a caricaturist for the magazine where he learned to mix humor and politics.

After arriving in Havana in 1965, Rostgaard began designing posters for the ICAIC and became artistic director of OSPAAAL in 1966, where he resided for nine years. From 1975 he worked for the Union of Cuban Writers and Artists. He also designed book and magazine covers and layouts.

Rostgaard's work has been widely exhibited and he has won a number of awards for his designs.

=== Artistic style ===
Referencing pop art and psychedelic poster art, Rostgaard's work also includes figurative painting and Warhol-inspired commercial graphics. The majority of his designs are playful and fun, a product of the artist's ability to incorporate a sense of humor into sometimes very serious subjects.

Rostgaard died in Havana on December 27, 2004.
