= 1943 in fine arts of the Soviet Union =

The year 1943 was marked by many events that left an imprint on the history of Soviet and Russian Fine Arts.

== Events ==
- February 23 — An Exhibition «The Red Army in a fight against Nazi invaders» was opened in Moscow in the Central House of Red Army. The participants were Mikhail Avilov, Igor Grabar, Pavel Korin, Matvey Manizer, Vera Mukhina, Arkady Plastov, Nikolai Tomsky, Konstantin Yuon, and other important Soviet artists.
- October 10 — Exhibition of works of the young Soviet artists dedicated to 25th anniversary of Komsokol was opened in Moscow in the Tretyakov gallery. Exhibited 271 works of painting and agraphics of 99 authors.

== Deaths ==
- February 17 — Konstantin Bogaevsky (Russian: Богаевский Константин Фёдорович), Russian Soviet painter, Honored Art worker of Russian Federation (born 1872).
- April 15 — Aristarkh Lentulov (Russian: Лентулов Аристарх Васильевич), Russian Soviet painter (born 1882).
- December 13 — Ivan Kliun (Russian: Клюн Иван Васильевич), Russian Soviet painter, avant-garde artist, sculptor, and graphic artist (born 1873).
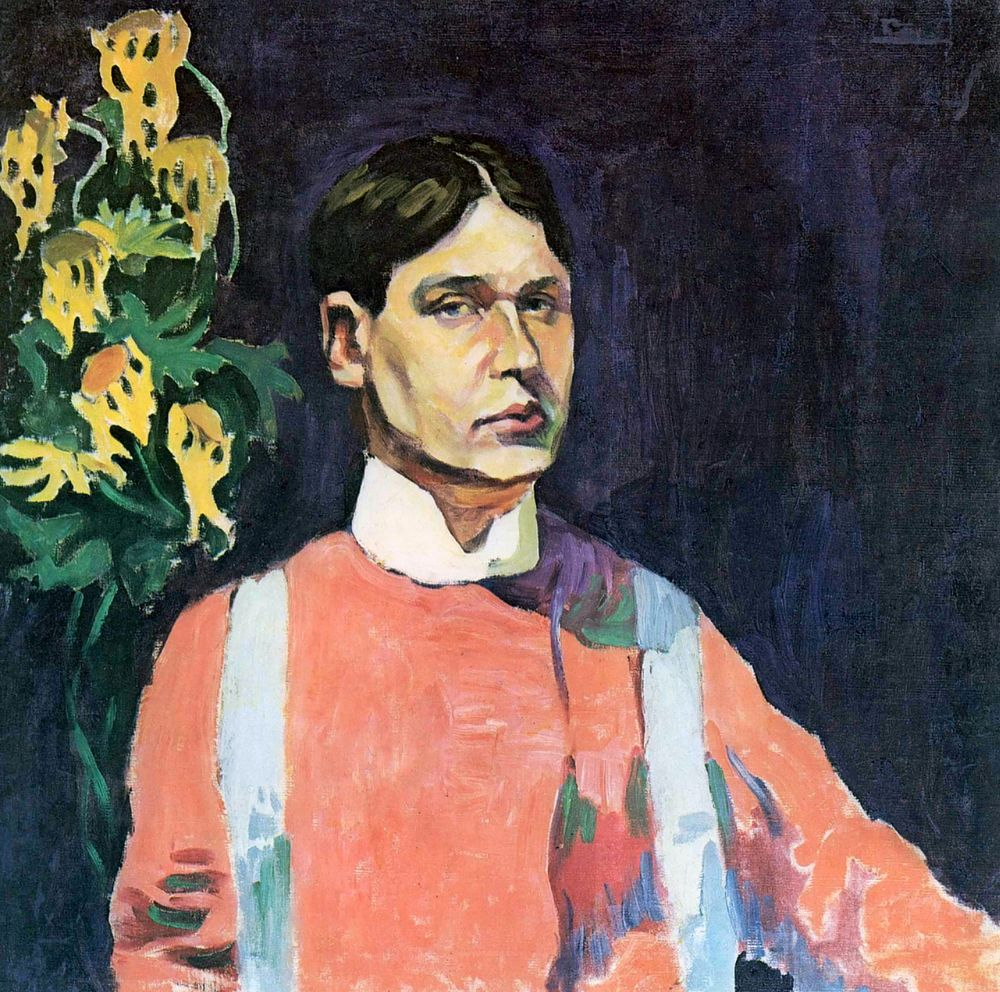
Aristarkh Lentulov

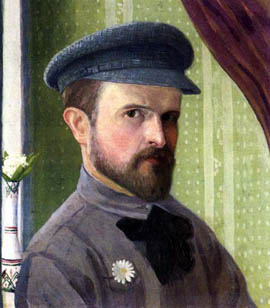
Ivan Kliun

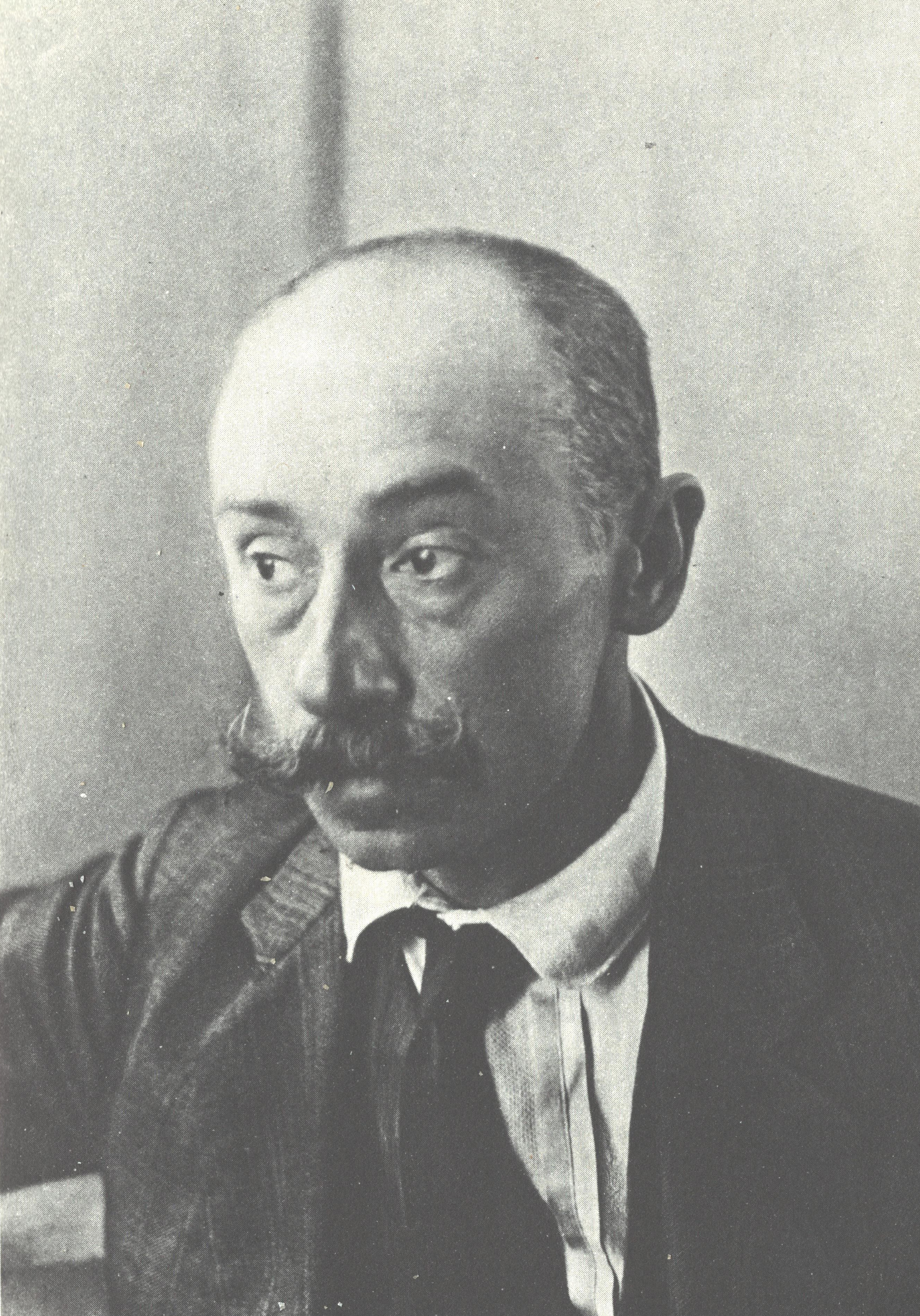
Konstantin Bogaevsky

== See also ==
- List of Russian artists
- List of painters of Leningrad Union of Artists
- Saint Petersburg Union of Artists
- Russian culture
- 1943 in the Soviet Union

== Sources ==
- Выставка работ молодых художников, посвящённая 25-летию ВЛКСМ // Правда. 1943, 11 октября.
- Открытие художественной выставки в ЦДКА // Литература и искусство. 1943, 23 февраля.
- Первая выставка художников-фронтовиков. Каталог. Л., Военгиз, 1943.
- Весенняя выставка ленинградских художников. Каталог. Л., ЛССХ, 1944.
- Героический фронт и тыл. Всесоюзная художественная выставка. Каталог. М., Комитет по делам искусств при СНК СССР, 1945.
- Выставки советского изобразительного искусства. Справочник. Том 3. 1941—1947 годы. М., Советский художник, 1973.
- Artists of Peoples of the USSR. Biography Dictionary. Vol. 1. Moscow, Iskusstvo, 1970.
- Artists of Peoples of the USSR. Biography Dictionary. Vol. 2. Moscow, Iskusstvo, 1972.
- Directory of Members of Union of Artists of USSR. Volume 1,2. Moscow, Soviet Artist Edition, 1979.
- Directory of Members of the Leningrad branch of the Union of Artists of Russian Federation. Leningrad, Khudozhnik RSFSR, 1980.
- Artists of Peoples of the USSR. Biography Dictionary. Vol. 4 Book 1. Moscow, Iskusstvo, 1983.
- Directory of Members of the Leningrad branch of the Union of Artists of Russian Federation. - Leningrad: Khudozhnik RSFSR, 1987.
- Персональные и групповые выставки советских художников. 1917-1947 гг. М., Советский художник, 1989.
- Artists of peoples of the USSR. Biography Dictionary. Vol. 4 Book 2. - Saint Petersburg: Academic project humanitarian agency, 1995.
- Link of Times: 1932 - 1997. Artists - Members of Saint Petersburg Union of Artists of Russia. Exhibition catalogue. - Saint Petersburg: Manezh Central Exhibition Hall, 1997.
- Matthew C. Bown. Dictionary of 20th Century Russian and Soviet Painters 1900-1980s. - London: Izomar, 1998.
- Vern G. Swanson. Soviet Impressionism. - Woodbridge, England: Antique Collectors' Club, 2001.
- Петр Фомин. Живопись. Воспоминания современников. СПб., 2002. С.107.
- Время перемен. Искусство 1960—1985 в Советском Союзе. СПб., Государственный Русский музей, 2006.
- Sergei V. Ivanov. Unknown Socialist Realism. The Leningrad School. - Saint-Petersburg: NP-Print Edition, 2007. - ISBN 5-901724-21-6, ISBN 978-5-901724-21-7.
- Anniversary Directory graduates of Saint Petersburg State Academic Institute of Painting, Sculpture, and Architecture named after Ilya Repin, Russian Academy of Arts. 1915 - 2005. - Saint Petersburg: Pervotsvet Publishing House, 2007.
