= Top of the World (Wadsworth) =

Painting by Edward Wadsworth

- Artist: Edward Wadsworth
- Year: 1942–43
- Medium: Tempera on canvas on wood
- Dimensions: 38 cm × 53.5 cm (15 in × 21.1 in)
- Location: Ferens Art Gallery, Kingston upon Hull

Top of the World is a 1942–43 painting by the English painter Edward Wadsworth. It depicts the road approaching Beswick's Lime Works in the Peak District.

The painting was finished in the beginning of July 1943. It was originally bought by the Contemporary Art Society through Arthur Tooth & Sons. Since 1944 it is in the collection of the Ferens Art Gallery in Hull.
