= Sighsten Herrgård =

Finnish-born Swedish fashion designer

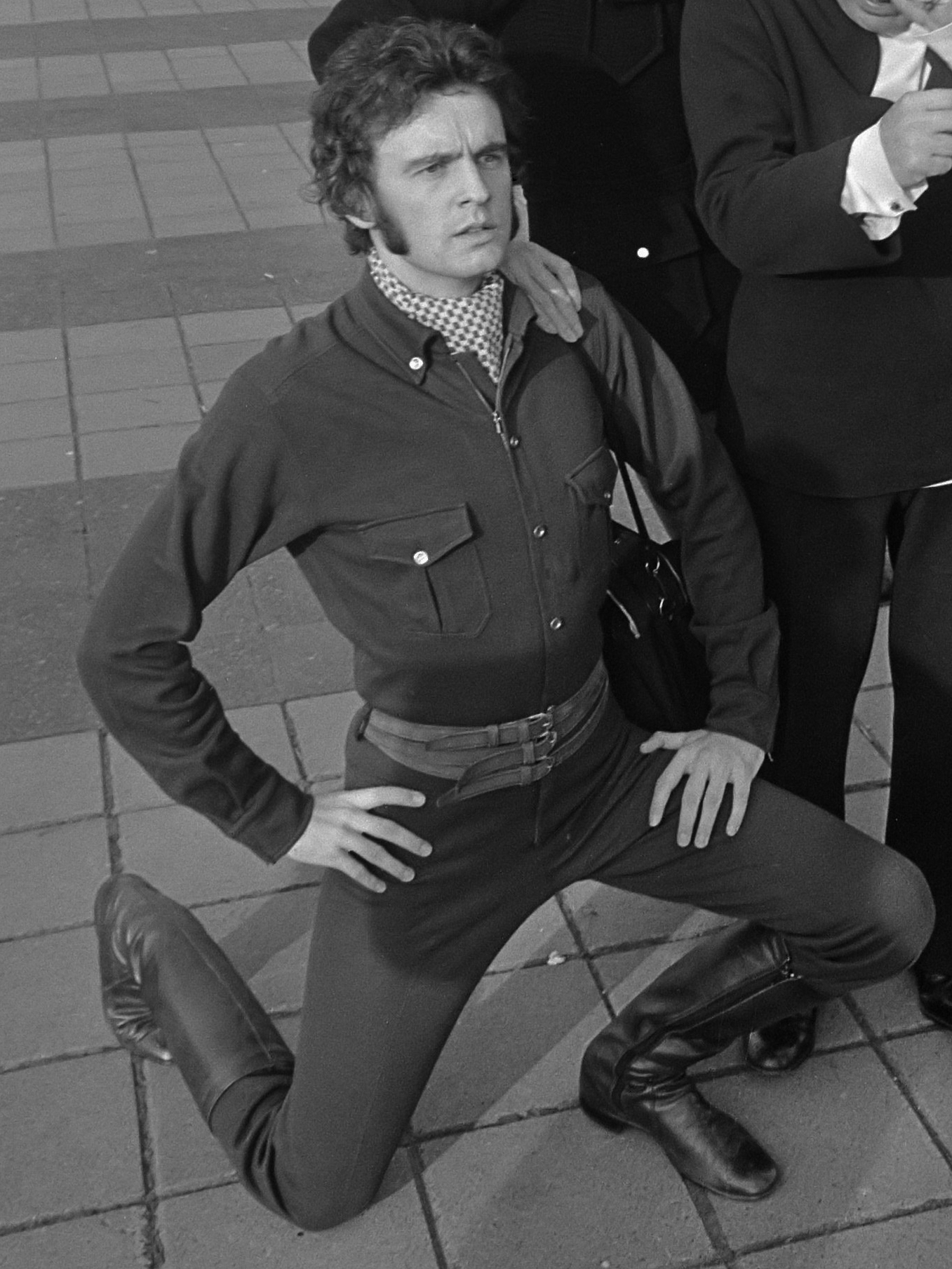
- Herrgård in 1969
- Born: 1943; Helsinki, Finland
- Died: 1989 (aged 45–46)
- Occupation: Fashion designer

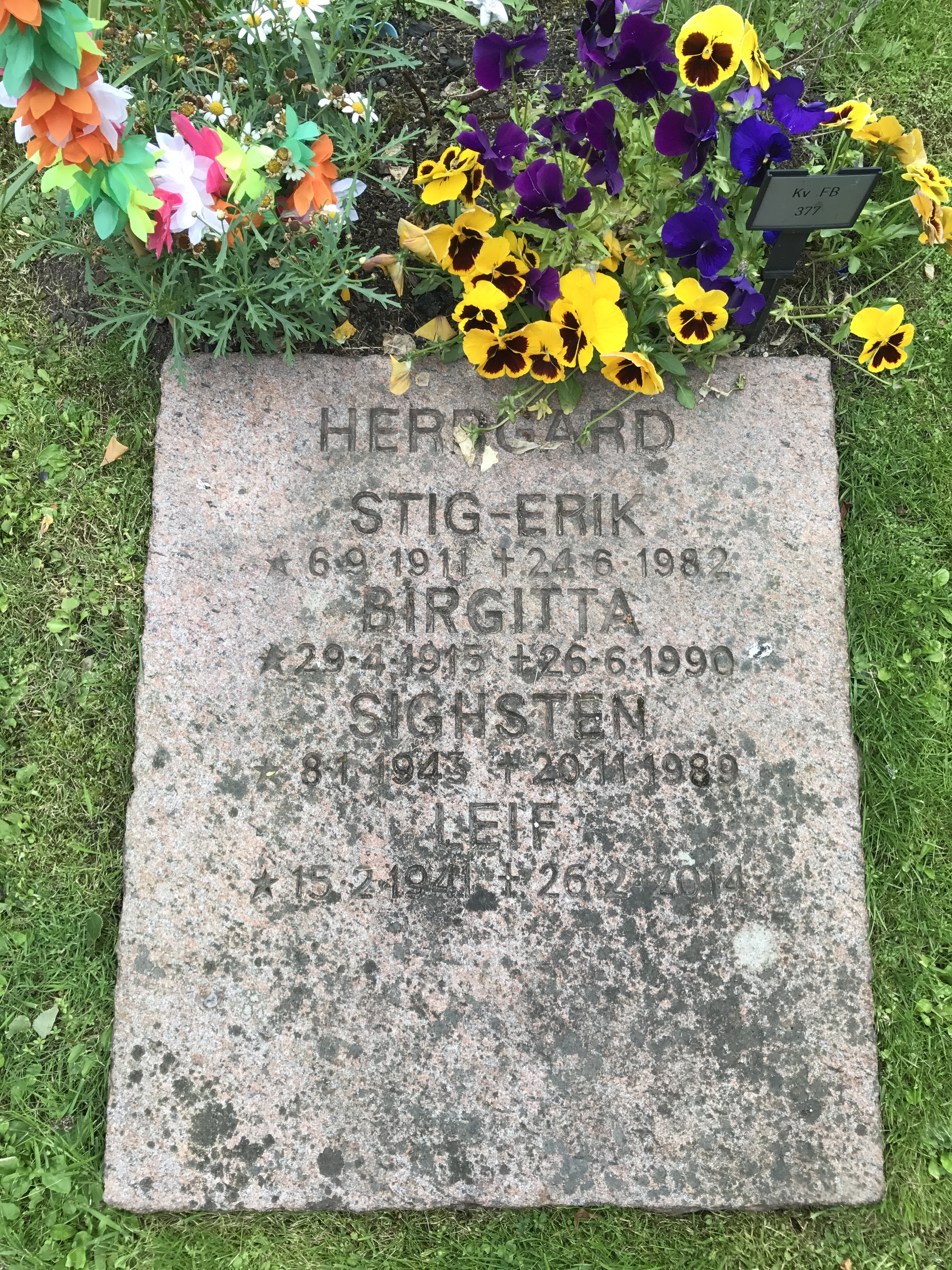
Herrgård family grave at Bromma Churchyard

Björn Sighsten Herrgård (1943–1989) was a Swedish fashion designer and major trendsetter in Stockholm. In 1987, Herrgård was the first Swedish celebrity with AIDS to disclose their status in public.

== Biography ==
Herrgård was born in Helsinki, Finland, and he moved to Sweden as a child in 1945. He received his fashion education at Beckmans School of Design in Stockholm and at the pattern development academies in Stockholm and Copenhagen. His career took off in 1966 when he won the Courtauld International Design Competition with a collection of unisex clothing. In the 1970s Herrgård established internationally in Paris and North America; he also started a company in Stockholm and worked with television, magazines and shows.

On 29 July 1987, Herrgård held a press conference, stating that "I'm going to die. I have AIDS. I may only have months left, but I want to die with dignity". His partner Roar Klingenberg (22 November 1941 – 21 September 1984), the first AIDS patient diagnosed in Sweden, had died 3 years earlier.
