= Cows and Groomers =

1943 painting by Jean Dubuffet

- Vaches et soigneurs (French)
- Artist: Jean Dubuffet
- Year: 1943
- Medium: oil paint on canvas
- Subject: Cows with their groomers
- Dimensions: 49 cm × 64.5 cm (19 in × 25.4 in)
- Location: Unterlinden Museum, Colmar
- Accession: 2008

Cows and Groomers is an oil painting on canvas by the French artist Jean Dubuffet, dated from August 1943. It is held in the collection of the Unterlinden Museum in Colmar, Alsace (inventory number 2008.8.22). The painting is one of the more than 120 works of French modern art, among which circa 20 works by Dubuffet, that were bequeathed to the museum by the collector, French journalist Jean-Paul Person (1927–2008), in 2008 (Person had already donated 16 works to the museum in 2004).

Painted during the German occupation of Paris Cows and Groomers, with its deliberately "naive" subject and its pointedly "childish" style, is typical for the early period of Dubuffet's anticonformist artistic attitude.
