= Jüri Kerem =

Estonian caricaturist and portraitist

Jüri Kerem (24 April 1943 – 8 September 1993) was an Estonian caricaturist and portraitist.

He was born in Tallinn.
