= Jean Dubuffet =

French painter and sculptor (1901–1985)

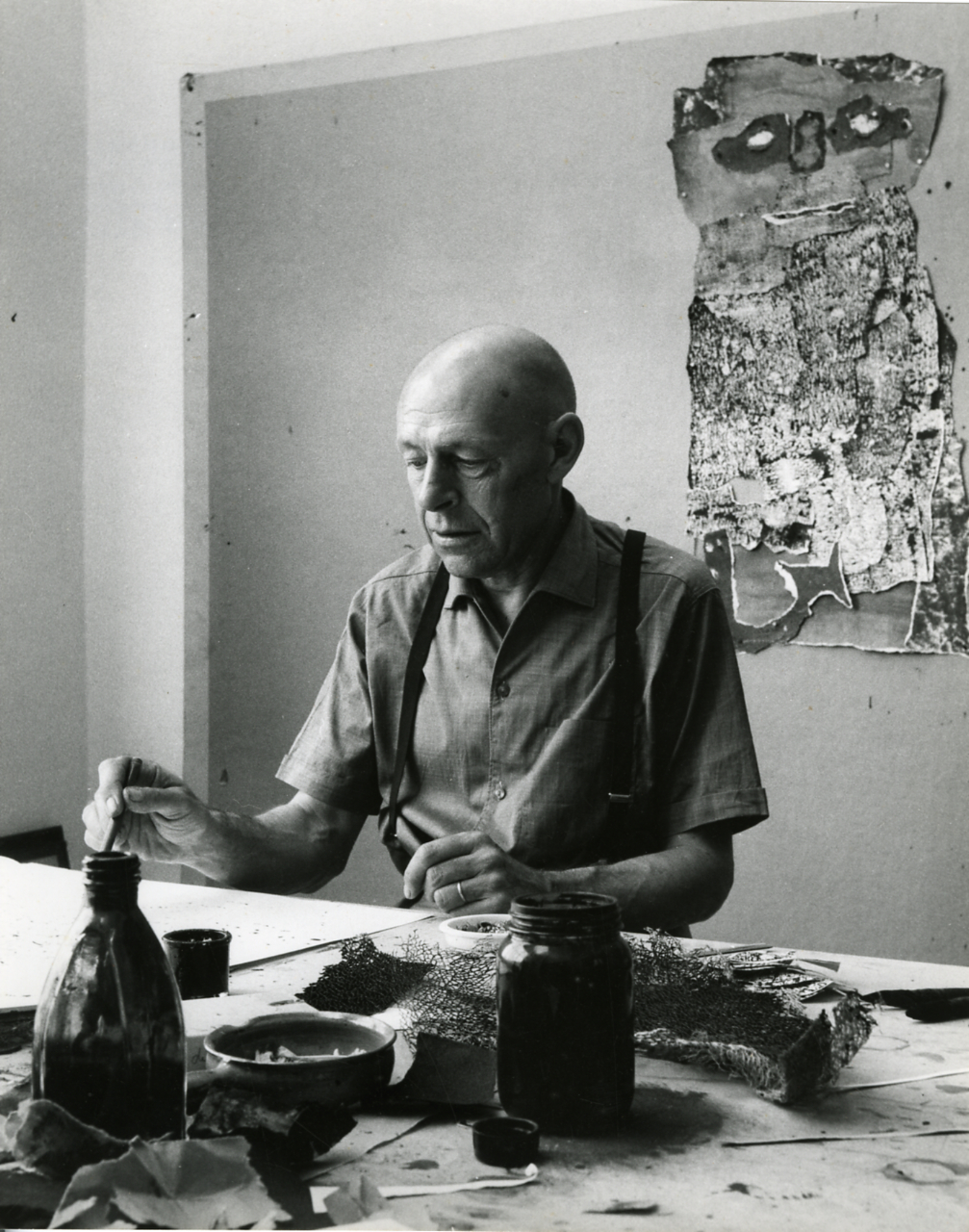
- Jean Dubuffet in 1960
- Born: Jean Philippe Arthur Dubuffet; 31 July 1901; Le Havre, France
- Died: 12 May 1985 (aged 83); Paris, France
- Known for: Painting, sculpture
- Movement: School of Paris

Signature
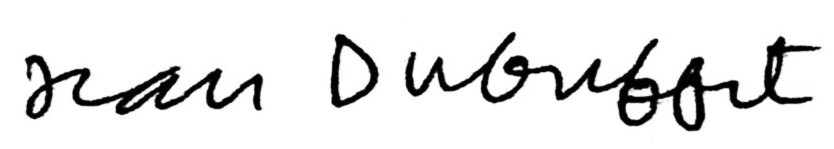

Jean Philippe Arthur Dubuffet (French pronunciation: [ʒɑ̃ filip aʁtyʁ dybyfɛ]; 31 July 1901 – 12 May 1985) was a French painter and sculptor of the École de Paris (School of Paris). His idealistic approach to aesthetics embraced so-called "low art" and eschewed traditional standards of beauty in favor of what he believed to be a more authentic and humanistic approach to image-making. He is perhaps best known for founding the art brut movement, and for the collection of works—Collection de l'art brut—that this movement spawned. Dubuffet enjoyed a prolific art career, both in France and in America, and was featured in many exhibitions throughout his lifetime.

== Early life ==
Dubuffet was born in Le Havre to a family of wholesale wine merchants who were part of the wealthy bourgeoisie. His childhood friends included the writers Raymond Queneau and Georges Limbour. He moved to Paris in 1918 to study painting at the Académie Julian, becoming close friends with the artists Juan Gris, André Masson, and Fernand Léger. Six months later, upon finding academic training to be distasteful, he left the Académie to study independently. During this time, Dubuffet developed many other interests, including free noise music, poetry, and the study of ancient and modern languages. Dubuffet also traveled to Italy and Brazil, and upon returning to Le Havre in 1925, he married for the first time and went on to start a small wine business in Paris. He took up painting again in 1934 when he made a large series of portraits in which he emphasized the vogues in art history. But again he stopped, developing his wine business at Bercy during the German Occupation of France. Years later, in an autobiographical text, he boasted about having made substantial profits by supplying wine to the Wehrmacht.

== Early work ==
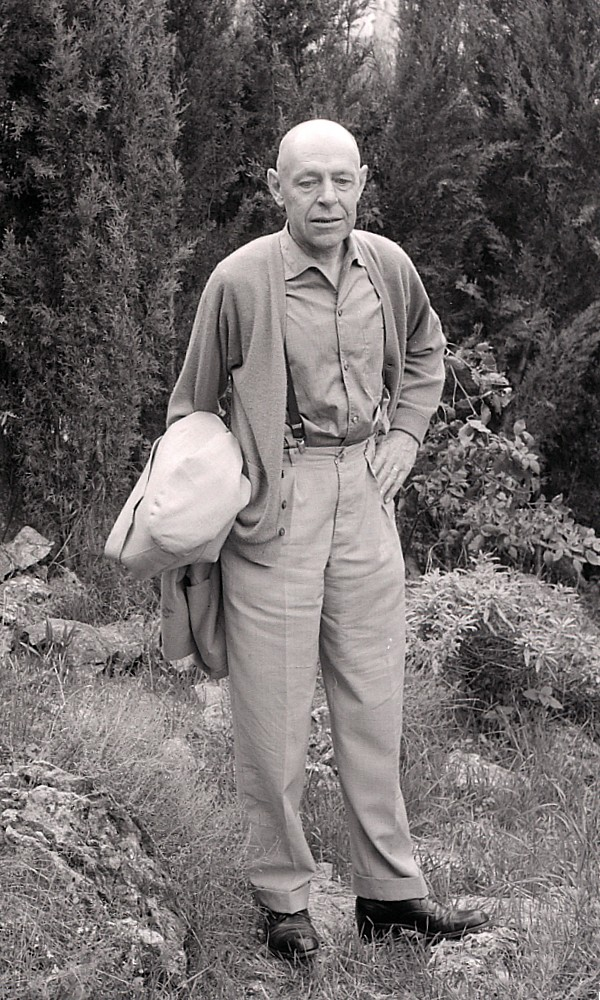
Jean Dubuffet, 1960

In 1942, Dubuffet decided to devote himself again to art. He often chose subjects for his works from everyday life, such as people sitting in the Paris Métro or walking in the country. Dubuffet painted with strong, unbroken colors, recalling the palette of Fauvism, as well as the Brucke painters, with their juxtaposing and discordant patches of color. Many of his works featured an individual or individuals placed in a very cramped space, which had a distinct psychological impact on viewers. In 1943, the writer George Limbour, a friend of Dubuffet from childhood, took Jean Paulhan to the artist's studio. Dubuffet's work at that time was unknown. Paulhan was impressed and the meeting proved to be a turning point for Dubuffet. His first solo show came in October 1944, at the Galerie Rene Drouin in Paris. This marked Dubuffet's third attempt to become an established artist.

In 1945, Dubuffet attended and was strongly impressed by a show in Paris of Jean Fautrier's paintings in which he recognized meaningful art which expressed directly and purely the depth of a person. Emulating Fautrier, Dubuffet started to use thick oil paint mixed with materials such as mud, sand, coal dust, pebbles, pieces of glass, string, straw, plaster, gravel, cement, and tar. This allowed him to abandon the traditional method of applying oil paint to canvas with a brush; instead, Dubuffet created a paste into which he could create physical marks, such as scratches and slash marks. The impasto technique of mixing and applying paint was best manifested in Dubuffet's series 'Hautes Pâtes' or Thick Impastoes, which he exhibited at his second major exhibition, entitled Microbolus Macadam & Cie/Hautes Pates in 1946 at the Galérie René Drouin. His use of crude materials and the irony that he infused into many of his works incited a significant amount of backlash from critics, who accused Dubuffet of 'anarchy' and 'scraping the dustbin'. He did receive some positive feedback as well—Clement Greenberg took notice of Dubuffet's work and wrote that '[f]rom a distance, Dubuffet seems the most original painter to have come out of the School of Paris since Miro...' Greenberg went on to say that 'Dubuffet is perhaps the one new painter of real importance to have appeared on the scene in Paris in the last decade.' Indeed, Dubuffet was very prolific in the United States in the year following his first exhibition in New York (1951).

After 1946, Dubuffet started a series of portraits, with his own friends Henri Michaux, Francis Ponge, George Limbour, Jean Paulhan and Pierre Matisse serving as 'models'. He painted these portraits in the same thick materials, and in a manner deliberately anti-psychological and anti-personal, as Dubuffet expressed himself. A few years later he approached the surrealist group in 1948, then the College of Pataphysique in 1954. He was friendly with the French playwright, actor and theater director Antonin Artaud, he admired and supported the writer Louis-Ferdinand Céline and was strongly connected with the artistic circle around the surrealist André Masson. In 1944 he started an important relationship with the resistance-fighter and French writer and publisher Jean Paulhan who was also strongly fighting against "intellectual terrorism", as he called it.

== Reception in America ==
Dubuffet achieved very rapid success in the American art market, largely due to his inclusion in the Pierre Matisse exhibition in 1946. His association with Matisse proved to be very beneficial. Matisse was a very influential dealer of contemporary European Art in America, and was known for strongly supporting the School of Paris artists. Dubuffet's work was placed among the likes of Picasso, Braque, and Rouault at the gallery exhibit, and he was one of only two young artists to be honored in this manner. A Newsweek article dubbed Dubuffet the 'darling of Parisian avant-garde circles,' and Greenberg wrote positively about Dubuffet's three canvases in a review of the exhibit. In 1947 Dubuffet had his first solo exhibition in America, in the same gallery as the Matisse exhibition. Reviews were largely favorable, and this resulted in Dubuffet having at least an annual, if not a biannual exhibition at that gallery.

Due to his participation in a steady stream of art exhibitions within his first few years in New York, Dubuffet became a constant presence in the American art world. Dubuffet's association with the School of Paris provided him with a unique vehicle to reach American audiences, even though he dissociated himself from most of the ideals of the school, and reacted very strongly against the 'great traditions of painting.' Americans were intrigued by Dubuffet's simultaneous roots in the established French vanguard and his work, which was such a strong reaction against his background. Many painters of the New York school at this time were also trying to seek status within the avant-garde tradition, and drew influence from Dubuffet's work. His reception in America was very closely linked to and dependent upon the New York art world's desire to create its own avant-garde environment.

Specific examples of American artists interested in Dubuffet's art were Alfonso Ossorio and Joseph Glasco. At the end of 1949, while Pierre Matisse was preparing Dubuffet's January 1950 show, Alfonso Ossorio had traveled to Paris to meet Dubuffet and buy some of his paintings. Then in 1950, at Ossorio's urging, his young friend Joseph Glasco left New York for Paris to meet Dubuffet. Glasco credited this encounter as having had an influence on his own art, and Dubuffet frequently asked about "Pollock and Glasco" in his letters to Ossorio.

== Transition to art brut ==
Between 1947 and 1949, Dubuffet took three separate trips to Algeria—a French colony at the time—in order to find further artistic inspiration. In this sense, Dubuffet is very similar to other artists such as Delacroix, Matisse, and Fromentin. However, the art that Dubuffet produced while he was there was very specific insofar as it recalled Post-War French ethnography in light of decolonization. Dubuffet was fascinated by the nomadic nature of the tribes in Algeria—he admired the ephemeral quality of their existence, in that they did not stay in any one particular area for long, and were constantly shifting. The impermanence of this kind of movement attracted Dubuffet and became a facet of art brut. In June 1948, Dubuffet, along with Jean Paulhan, Andre Breton, Charles Ratton, Michel Tapie, and Henri-Pierre Roche, officially established La Compagnie de l'art brut in Paris. This association was dedicated to the discovery, documentation and exhibition of art brut. Dubuffet later amassed his own collection of such art, including artists Aloïse Corbaz and Adolf Wölfli. This collection is now housed at the Collection de l'art brut in Lausanne, Switzerland. His art brut collection is often referred to as a "museum without walls", as it transcended national and ethnic boundaries, and effectively broke down barriers between nationalities and cultures.

Court les rues (1962) at the Milwaukee Art Museum, an example of a non-painterly Dubuffet painting

Influenced by Hans Prinzhorn's book Artistry of the Mentally Ill, Dubuffet coined the term art brut (meaning "raw art", often referred to as 'outsider art') for art produced by non-professionals working outside aesthetic norms, such as art by psychiatric patients, prisoners, and children. Dubuffet felt that the simple life of the everyday human being contained more art and poetry than did academic art, or great painting. He found the latter to be isolating, mundane, and pretentious, and wrote in his Prospectus aux amateurs de tout genre that his aim was 'not the mere gratification of a handful of specialists, but rather the man in the street when he comes home from work....it is the man in the street whom I feel closest to, with whom I want to make friends and enter into confidence, and he is the one I want to please and enchant by means of my work.' To that end, Dubuffet began to search for an art form in which everyone could participate and by which everyone could be entertained. He sought to create an art as free from intellectual concerns as Art Brut, and as a result, his work often appears primitive and childlike. His form is often compared to wall scratchings and children's art. Nonetheless, Dubuffet appeared to be quite erudite when it came to writing about his own work. According to prominent art critic Hilton Kramer, "There is only one thing wrong with the essays Dubuffet has written on his own work: their dazzling intellectual finesse makes nonsense of his claim to a free and untutored primitivism. They show us a mandarin literary personality, full of chic phrases and up-to-date ideas, that is quite the opposite of the naive visionary."

Dubuffet's art brut also encompassed folk art. He and Paulhan helped organise the first exhibitions of Somuk, an artist from Buka Island whose works had been collected by Catholic priest Patrick O'Reilly.

== Artistic style ==
Dubuffet's art primarily features the resourceful exploitation of unorthodox materials. Many of Dubuffet's works are painted in oil paint using an impasto thickened by materials such as sand, tar and straw, giving the work an unusually textured surface. Dubuffet was the first artist to use this type of thickened paste, called bitumen. Additionally, in his earlier paintings, Dubuffet dismissed the concept of perspective in favor of a more direct, two-dimensional presentation of space. Instead, Dubuffet created the illusion of perspective by crudely overlapping objects within the picture plane. This method most directly contributed to the cramped effect of his works.

From 1962 he produced a series of works in which he limited himself to the colours red, white, black, and blue. Towards the end of the 1960s he turned increasingly to sculpture, producing works in polystyrene which he then painted with vinyl paint.

Dubuffet has influenced Linda Naeff.

== Other enterprises ==
In late 1960–1961, Dubuffet began experimenting with music and sound and made several recordings with the Danish painter Asger Jorn, a founding member of the avant-garde movement COBRA. The same period he started making sculpture, but in a very not-sculptural way. As his medium he preferred to use the ordinary materials as papier-mâché and for all the light medium polystyrene, in which he could model very fast and switch easily from one work to another, as sketches on paper. At the end of the 1960s he started to create his large sculpture-habitations, such as 'Tour aux figures', 'Jardin d'Hiver' and 'Villa Falbala' in which people can wander, stay, and contemplate. In 1969 ensued an acquaintance between him and the French Outsider Art artist Jacques Soisson. Jean Dubuffet also maintained an extensive illustrated correspondence with Jean-Joseph Sanfourche for eighteen years.

In 1974 Dubuffet created Jardin d'émail, a very large outdoor painted sculpture designed for the Kröller-Müller Museum.

In 1978 Dubuffet collaborated with American composer and musician Jasun Martz to create the record album artwork for Martz's avant-garde symphony entitled The Pillory. The much written about drawing has been reproduced internationally in three different editions on tens-of-thousands of record albums and compact discs. A detail of the drawing is also featured on Martz's second symphony (2005), The Pillory/The Battle, performed by The Intercontinental Philharmonic Orchestra and Royal Choir.

== Death ==
Dubuffet died from emphysema in Paris on 12 May 1985.

== Exhibitions ==
The Fondation Jean Dubuffet collects and exhibits his work.

The following is a chronological list of exhibits featuring Dubuffet, along with the number of his works displayed at each exhibit.

- 1944: Galerie Rene Drouin, Paris
- 1946: Galerie Rene Drouin, Paris
- 1951: Pierre Matisse Gallery, New York 29 works
- 1955: Institute of Contemporary Arts, London 56 works
- 1957: Stadtisches Museum, Leverkusen 87 works
- 1958: Arthur Tooth and Sons, London 31 works
- 1959: Pierre Matisse Gallery, New York 77 works
- 1960: Arthur Tooth and Sons, London 40 works
- 1960: Kestner-Gesellschaft, Hanover 88 works
- 1960: Musee des Arts Decoratifs, Paris 402 works
- 1960: Hanover Gallery, London 27 works
- 1962: Museum of Modern Art, New York 85 works
- 1962: Robert Fraser Gallery, London 60 works
- 1963: Galleria Marlborough, Rome 68 works
- 1964: Robert Fraser Gallery, London 18 works
- 1964: Palazzo Grassi, Venice 107 works
- 1964-5: Stedelijk Museum, Amsterdam 198 works
- 1964-5: Galerie Jeanne Bucher, Paris 18 works
- 1964-5: Galerie Claude Bernard, Paris 46 works
- 1965: Galerie Beyeler, Basel 88 works
- 1965: Gimpel Hanover Galerie, Zurich 34 works
- 1966: Institute of Contemporary Arts, London 76 works
- 1966: Robert Fraser Gallery, London 13 works
- 2001: Jean Dubuffet: Exposition du centenaire, Centre Pompidou, Paris
- 2016: Dubuffet Drawings, 1935–1962, Morgan Library & Museum, New York City
- 2019: Jean Dubuffet: un barbare en Europe MuCEM, Marseille, France
- 2021: Jean Dubuffet: Brutal Beauty, Barbican Art Gallery, London
- 2025: Jean Dubuffet: Le Défi au Quotidien, Doyenné Arts Centre, Brioude, Auvergne. 60 works

== Notable works ==
- Cows and Groomers (August 1943)
- The Cow with the Subtile Nose (1954)
- Group of Four Trees (1972)
- La Chiffonnière (1978)
- Monument au Fantôme (1977)
- Monument with Standing Beast (1984)

== Art market ==
On 25 June 2019, an auction record was set when the artist's work Cérémonie (Ceremony) sold for £8.718.750 ($11.1 million) at Christie's.

On 15 April 2021, Dubuffet's La féconde journée (1976), was auctioned for £4.378.500 ($6.369.265) in a Phillips art auction in London.

== See also ==
- Auguste Marie

== Selected bibliography ==
=== Catalogue Raisonné ===
- Catalogue des travaux de Jean Dubuffet, Fascicule I-XXXVIII, Pauvert: Paris, 1965–1991
- Webel, Sophie, L'Œuvre gravé et les livres illustrés par Jean Dubuffet. Catalogue raisonné. Lebon: Paris 1991

=== Writings ===
- Jean Dubuffet, Prospectus et tous écrits suivants, Tome I, II, Paris 1967; Tome III, IV, Gallimard: Paris 1995
- Jean Dubuffet, Asphyxiating Culture and other Writings. New York: Four Walls Eight Windows, 1986
  ISBN 0-941423-09-3

=== Principal studies ===
- George Limbour, L'Art brut de Jean Dubuffet (Tableau bon levain à vous de cuire la pâte), Paris, Éditions Galerie René Drouin, 1953.
- Michel Ragon, Dubuffet, New York: Grove Press, 1959 (Translated from French by Haakon Chevalier.)
  OCLC 1310555
- Peter Selz, The Work of Jean Dubuffet, New York: The Museum of Modern Art, 1962
- Max Loreau, Jean Dubuffet, délits déportements lieux de haut jeu, Paris: Weber, 1971
- Andreas Franzke, Jean Dubuffet, Basel: Beyeler, 1976 (Translated from German by Joachim Neugröschel.)
  OCLC 3669520
- Andreas Franzke, Jean Dubuffet, New York: Harry N. Abrams, Inc. 1981 (Translated from German by Erich Wolf.)
  ISBN 0-81090-815-8
- Michel Thévoz, Jean Dubuffet, Geneva: Albert Skira, 1986
- Mildred Glimcher, Jean Dubuffet: Towards an Alternative Reality. New York: Pace Gallery 1987
  ISBN 0-89659-782-2
- Mechthild Haas, Jean Dubuffet, Berlin: Reimer, 1997 (German)
  ISBN 3-49601-176-9
- Jean Dubuffet, Paris: Centre Georges Pompidou, 2001
  ISBN 2-84426-093-4
- Laurent Danchin, Jean Dubuffet, New York: Vilo International, 2001
  ISBN 2-87939-240-3
- Jean Dubuffet: Trace of an Adventure, ed. by Agnes Husslein-Arco, Munich: Prestel, 2003
  ISBN 3-7913-2998-7
- Michael Krajewski, Jean Dubuffet. Studien zu seinem Fruehwerk und zur Vorgeschichte des Art brut, Osnabrueck: Der andere Verlag, 2004
  ISBN 3-89959-168-2
- Marianne Jakobi, Julien Dieudonné, Dubuffet, Paris, Perrin, 2007, ISBN 978-2-262-02089-7.
