= African Americans in California =

Ethnic group, race, and minority in California

Total population
- July 2022: c. 2.5 million, not including partially African American individuals (6.5%)

Regions with significant populations
- Bakersfield and Fresno region • Greater Los Angeles (especially South Los Angeles, the South Bay, Compton, Inglewood, Antelope Valley and Inland Empire) • Southeast San Diego • San Francisco Bay Area (esp. the East Bay, the Fillmore District and southern San Francisco) • Sacramento Valley • Stockton area • San Jose • Vallejo/Fairfield

Languages
- California English, African-American Vernacular English;, African languages, Caribbean languages spoken by the black Caribbean minority, Mexican Spanish, Jamaican Patois, Haitian Creole, Amharic, Ethiopian languages, Spanglish, Garifuna and Spanish spoken by Black Hispanics, Louisiana Creole

Religion
- Christianity, Irreligion, some practice Islam, Judaism, Haitian Voodoo, Louisiana Voodoo, Rastafari, Hoodoo (spirituality) and Traditional African religions

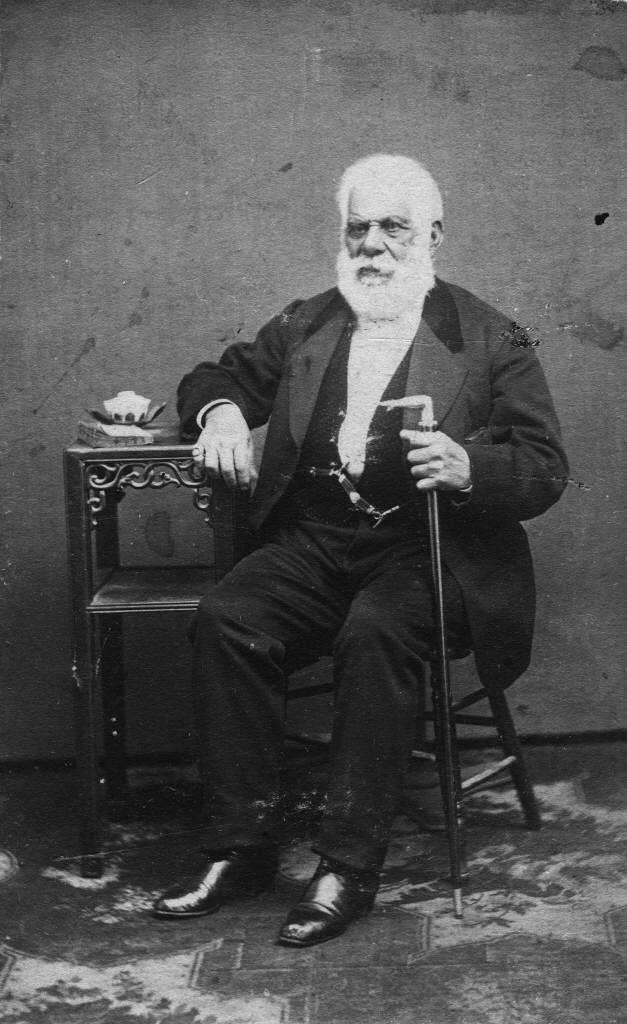
Pío Pico, California's last governor under Mexican rule, was of mixed Spanish, Native American, and African descent

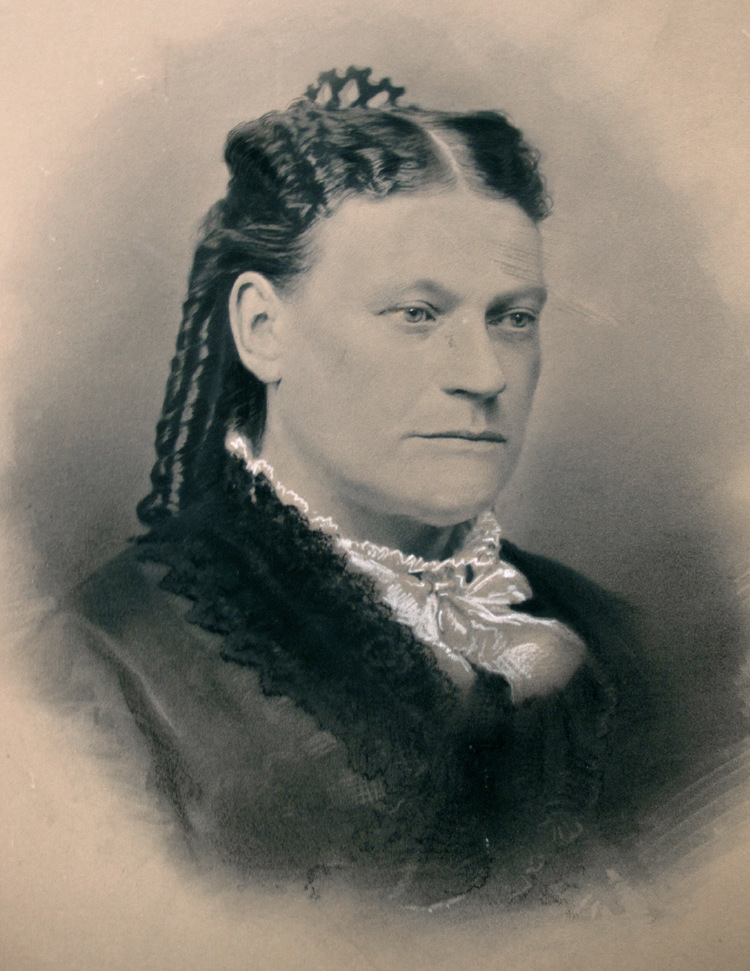
Juana Briones de Miranda, the "founding mother of San Francisco", was of mixed-race with African ancestry

According to 2019 United States Census Bureau estimates, residents of the state of California identified solely as African American or Black constituted 5.8% or 2,282,144 residents in California. Including an additional 1.2% who identified as having partial African ancestry, the figure was 7.0% (2.8 million residents). As of 2021, California has the largest multiracial African American population by number in the United States. African Americans are the fourth largest ethnic group in California after Hispanics, Whites, and Asians. Asians outnumbered African Americans in the 1980s.

The Black community is prevalent in Alameda, Contra Costa, San Francisco, and Solano Counties in the San Francisco Bay Area, Sacramento County, and San Joaquin County. In Southern California, the population is concentrated in Los Angeles, San Bernardino, and San Diego Counties.

California also has a growing Afro-Caribbean and African immigrant population to the United States. Most African immigrants in California come from Nigeria, Ethiopia, and Eritrea. Many Ethiopians live in Little Ethiopia in West Los Angeles. California has one of the highest concentrations of black Africans in the Western United States. 41,249 Afro-Asians live in California. There is a Blaxican community in California. There is also a growing Blaxican population in Los Angeles. California claimed 113,255 African-born residents in 2000. The majority came from Ethiopia, Nigeria, and South Africa. There is also a sizable Jamaican, Haitian, Caribbean, Afro-Latino, and Belizean population in California. There is also a small Bahamian, Barbadian, Bermudan, British West Indian, Dutch West Indian, and Trinidadian population in California. There is a large Garifuna community in Southern California.

The earliest black residents were the first pioneers of Alta California and were Afro-Latino slaves (or mulatto) brought by the Spanish. African Americans (and Louisiana Creole) migrated from Southern states like Louisiana, Mississippi, Arkansas, Texas, Alabama, Georgia and Oklahoma, to California during the Second Great Migration (1940s–1970s).

The Black population in California has been declining since 2016, and moving out of the state. Gentrification in California has caused some African Americans in California to become homeless and has pushed them out of historical urban centers like Oakland, San Francisco and Los Angeles, and into new cheaper suburban regions, like East Contra Costa, Inland Empire, and Central Valley. For example, many blacks from Los Angeles have moved to desert areas such as Palmdale and Lancaster in the 1990s. The black population in Los Angeles County has been rapidly declining. The black population has also declined in San Francisco. African Americans have the second highest poverty rate in California, after Hispanics. This has caused many blacks from California to move back to cities in the Southern United States, such as Atlanta, Dallas, Houston, Birmingham, Memphis, San Antonio and Jackson.

The black population has decreased in many neighborhoods and cities in California. Many areas such as Compton, Inglewood, and Watts that were once predominately black are now predominately Latino. Many Mexicans and Central Americans have displaced them in their historical areas. In 2019, African Americans were more likely to become homeless in California.

There is also a black foreign born population from Africa, Latin America and the Caribbean in California. 3% of black people in California are noncitizens, and 4% are naturalized immigrants. African Americans mainly live in Los Angeles, the East Bay of the San Francisco Bay Area and Sacramento. Solano County has the highest black percentage by county. Cities with the largest black population in the San Francisco Bay Area are African Americans in the Bay Area are Oakland, Vallejo, Antioch, Suisun City and Richmond.

Black immigrants in California mainly come from Nigeria, Ethiopia, Jamaica, Kenya and Belize.

== History ==
Before the arrival of European colonists and African slaves, the Indigenous peoples of California mainly inhabited the region. Native Americans were initially enslaved before Africans were brought to the area.

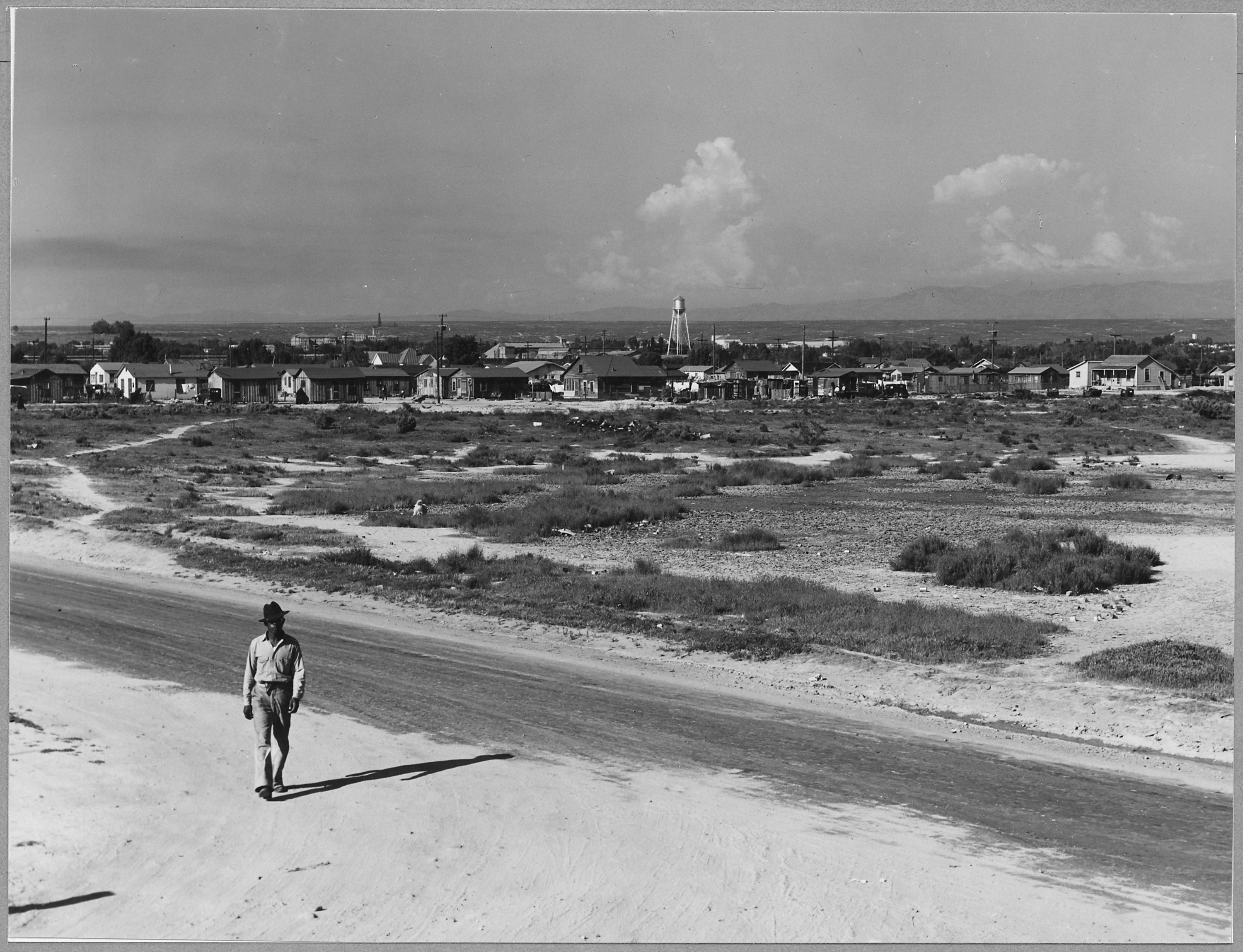
Black settlement in East Bakersfield

California was named after a fictional black character named Queen Calafia, in Garci Rodríguez de Montalvo’s 16th-century Spanish novel "Las sergas de Esplandián."

=== 18th century ===
People of African descent first appeared in California from Mexico due to the Spanish conquest. Spanish soldiers, priests, and settlers brought black slaves and free blacks into the state in the 18th-century. The settlers and escort soldiers who founded the towns of San José de Guadalupe (San Jose), Yerba Buena (San Francisco), Monterey, San Diego, and La Reina de Los Ángeles (Los Angeles) were primarily mestizo and of mixed Negro and Native American ancestry from the province of Sonora y Sinaloa in Mexico. There were also many mulattoes (part black, part Spanish) in Alta California.

Spanish military commander and explorer Juan Bautista de Anza brought Afro-Latinos of mixed African, Indigenous and Spanish ancestry to the region.

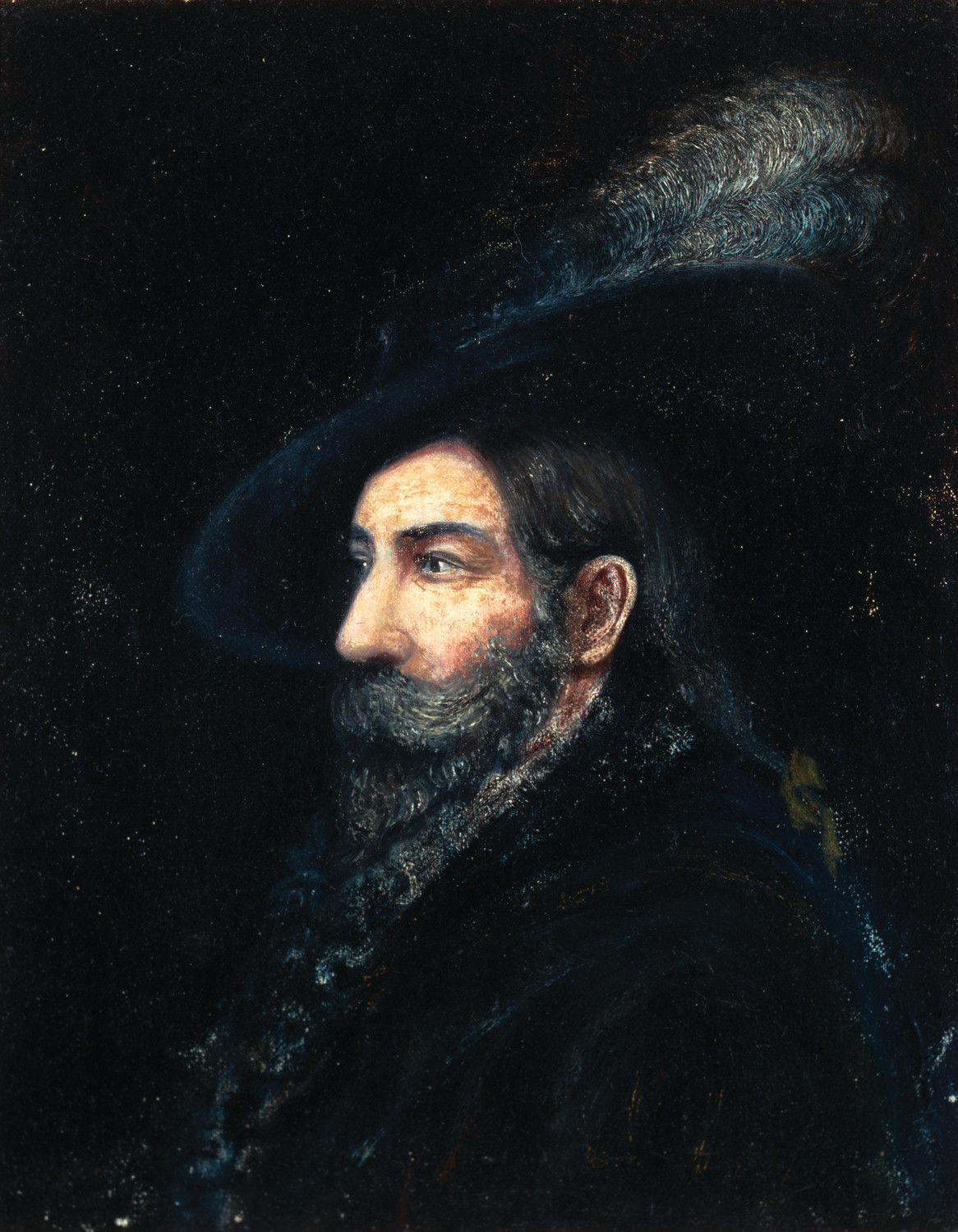
Juan Bautista de Anza brought Afro-Latinos to California.

=== 19th century ===
Influential people of African ancestry were among the earliest California settlers and landowners. Pío Pico was a Californio politician, ranchero, and entrepreneur of mixed-race with African ancestry, he had served as the last governor of Alta California under Mexican rule (from 1845 until 1846). Juana Briones de Miranda was a Californio business woman of mixed-race with African ancestry, she is considered the "Founding Mother of San Francisco", as an early settler of Yerba Buena (now San Francisco). William Leidesdorff was black and multi-racial, he was one another founder of San Francisco.

After the discovery of gold in California on January 24, 1848, African Americans in search of wealth, and freedom arrived in the state during the California gold rush seeking their own gold discoveries. Additionally, white Southerners brought black slaves into the California mines starting in 1849, and were primarily migrating from Texas, Mississippi, Missouri, and Arkansas. The Sweet Vengeance Mine was a gold mine in Browns Valley, discovered by African American miners during the gold rush. Moses Rodgers was considered one of the best miners in the state.

White men raped black women during the Gold Rush.

Some of the oldest African American churches in California are the Saint Andrews African Methodist Episcopal Church of Sacramento (founded in 1850, formerly known as Bethel African Methodist Episcopal Church), the Third Baptist Church in San Francisco (founded in 1852), Bethel African Methodist Episcopal Church (Bethel AME Church) in San Francisco (founded in 1852), African Methodist Episcopal Zion Church (AME Zion Church) in San Francisco (founded in 1852), and the First African Methodist Episcopal Church of Los Angeles (founded in 1872). In the 1870s, Rev. Peter William Cassey helped form two new Black Episcopalian churches in San Francisco; "Christ's Mission Church" (or Christ Mission Church), and he worked closely with the congregation from what later became St. Cyprian's Church, however neither group had a building at that time.

Many of the earliest African Americans in the state held the California State Convention of Colored Citizens, a series of colored convention events active from 1855 to 1902. At the conventions they had elected delegates from the various counties and would discuss topics like slavery, public education, and voting rights.

Archy Lee had been formerly enslaved African American and he was part of a series of notable 19th-century court cases that helped defined civil rights in the state by 1858. Edward Duplex was the first Black mayor in California, elected to office in Wheatland in 1888.

The first census recorded of African Americans in California appeared in 1850 with 962 people, and in 1860 with 4,086 people. Then, in 1910 the number rose to 22,000.

=== 20th century ===
In the 1920s during the end of the Barbary Coast-era, Terrific Street was an entertainment district in San Francisco and it was home to numerous black and tan clubs (interracial clubs that often highlighted African American culture).

African Americans migrated during the Second Great Migration from the Southern United States (places like Arkansas, Louisiana, Oklahoma and Texas) to the Northeast, Midwest and West to escape Jim Crow laws, between 1940 and 1970. They also migrated to the state for better job opportunities, with many working in the defense industry and shipyards in California. Of the Black Louisianans who migrated to California, a number were Louisiana Creoles.

Before World War II, African Americans totaled to less than one percent of California's population. The California population of African Americans grew slowly, alongside other minorities, with only 21,645 African American residents in 1910 compared to 2 million white residents. Post-World War II, African Americans boosted their population enormously in California.

Between the late-1940s until the early-1960s in San Francisco and Los Angeles, a new style of jazz was developed primarily by African Americans called West Coast jazz.

Your Black Muslim Bakery was a chain of bakeries opened by Yusuf Bey in 1968 in Santa Barbara, and moved headquarters in 1971 to Oakland; it had been a model of African American economic self-sufficiency but was later linked to physical and sexual abuse, welfare fraud, and murder which forced its closure on August 9, 2007.

In 1991, Rodney King, an African American, was the victim of police brutality when he was beaten by three Los Angeles Police Department (LAPD) officers during his arrest. The Rodney King beating was caught on videotape, and after the police acquittal verdict the event was followed by the 1992 Los Angeles riots. After the 1992 riots some 50 people were murdered, an estimated 2,000 people were injured and 8,000 people were arrested.

Affirmative action is a set of laws, policies, guidelines, and administrative practices "intended to end and correct the effects of a specific form of discrimination". In November 1996, affirmative action was abolished through Proposition 209 by California lawmakers.

=== 21st century ===
In the year 2000, California claimed 113,255 African immigrants in state, with the San Francisco Bay Area housing around 29,930 black immigrants. Most of the African immigrants came from Ethiopia. The next largest numbers were from Nigeria, Egypt, and South Africa. Approximately 45,000 Ethiopians and 6,000 Eritreans live in Los Angeles. California is a destination for Egyptian and South African immigrants.

In the 2010s, California was a net loser of black migration for the first time in three decades. Most exiting California blacks are returning to Texas and the Atlanta metropolitan area. In 2018, there are Black neighborhoods and cities with Black populations surpassing 15% in Southern California like in Compton, South Los Angeles and Inglewood, and in Northern California like Stockton, Oakland, and Vallejo. Oakland has been noted for being a center of Northern California's black population, with it being at least 25% black as of 2020. Many African Americans who settled in California, likewise in Oakland, worked on the railroad in Oakland and East Bay areas in the early-to-mid 1900s.

In 2020, anti-Black hate crimes in California has increased. In 2020–2022, the COVID-19 deaths rose for African Americans in California, which had the lowest vaccination rates in the state.

Related museums

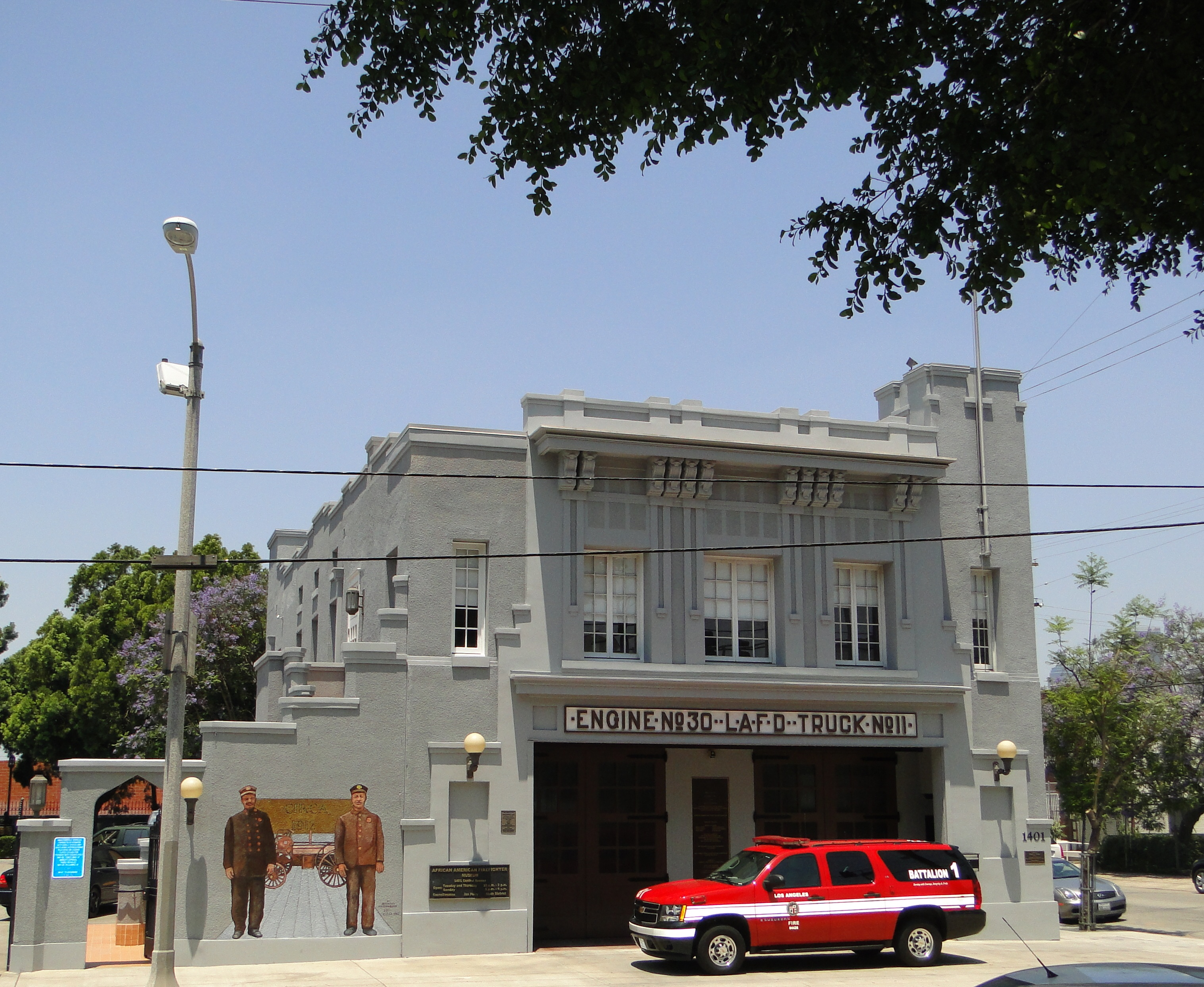
African American Firefighter Museum (formerly Fire Station No. 30), Los Angeles

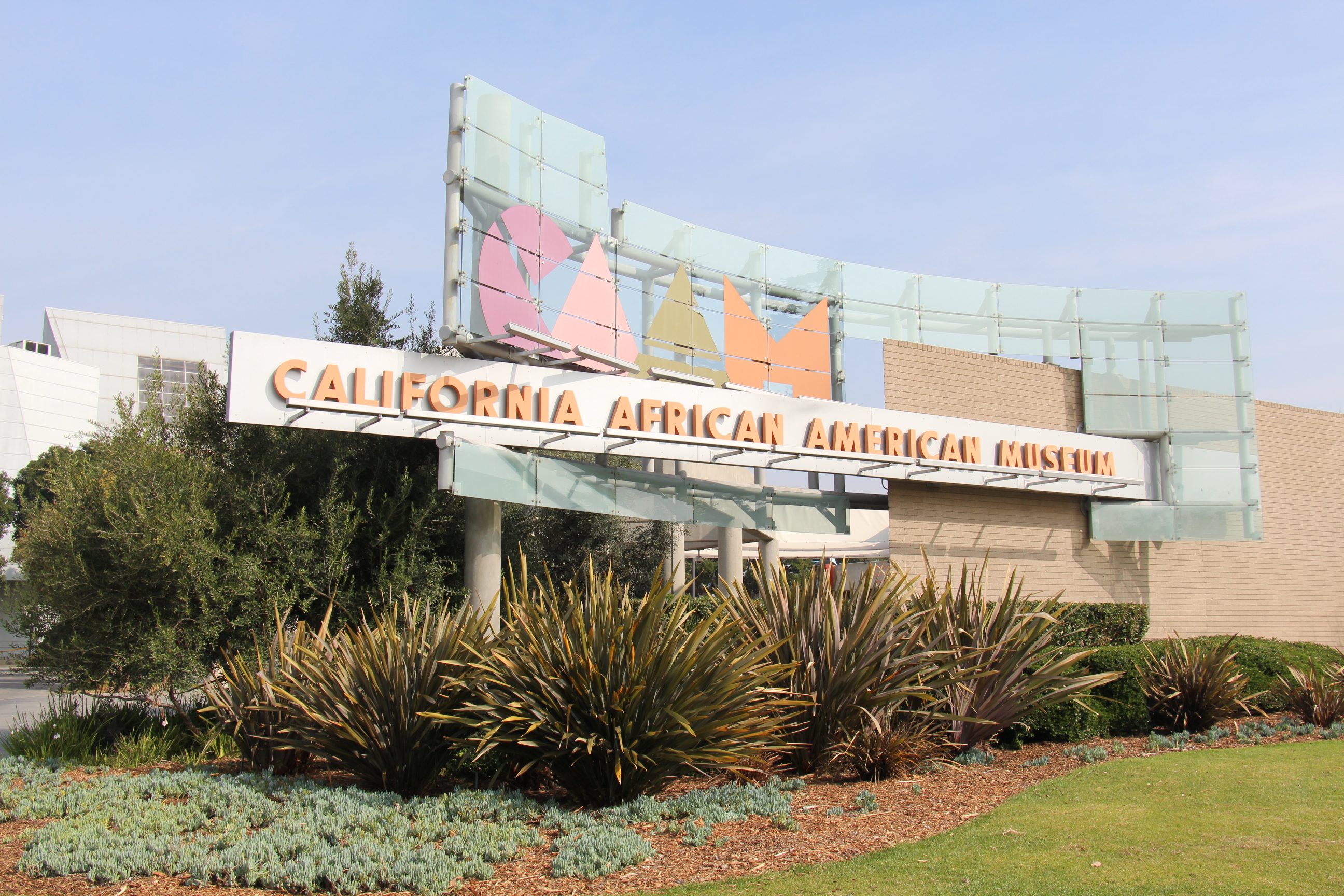
California African American Museum, Los Angeles

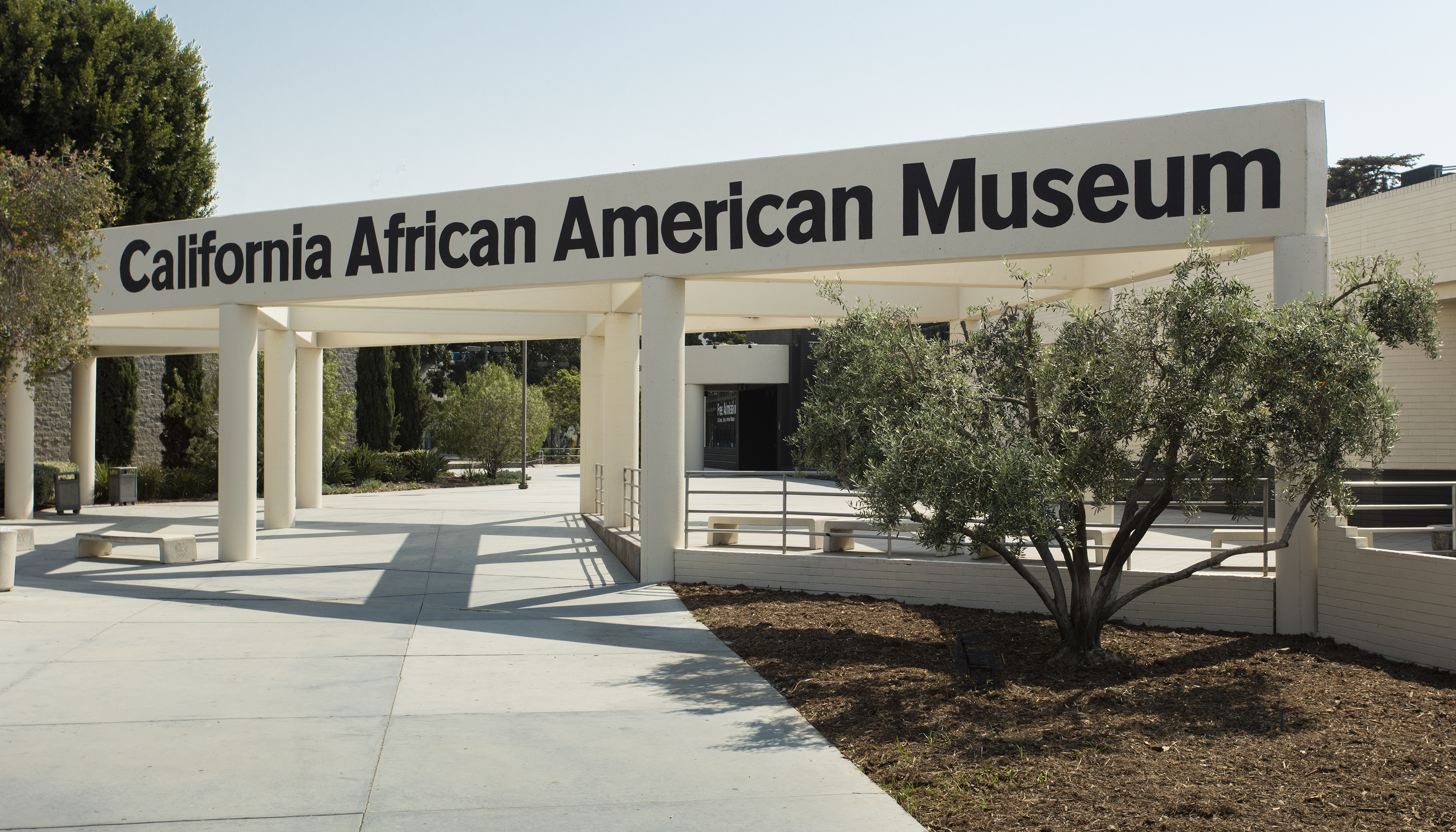
California African American Museum, Los Angeles

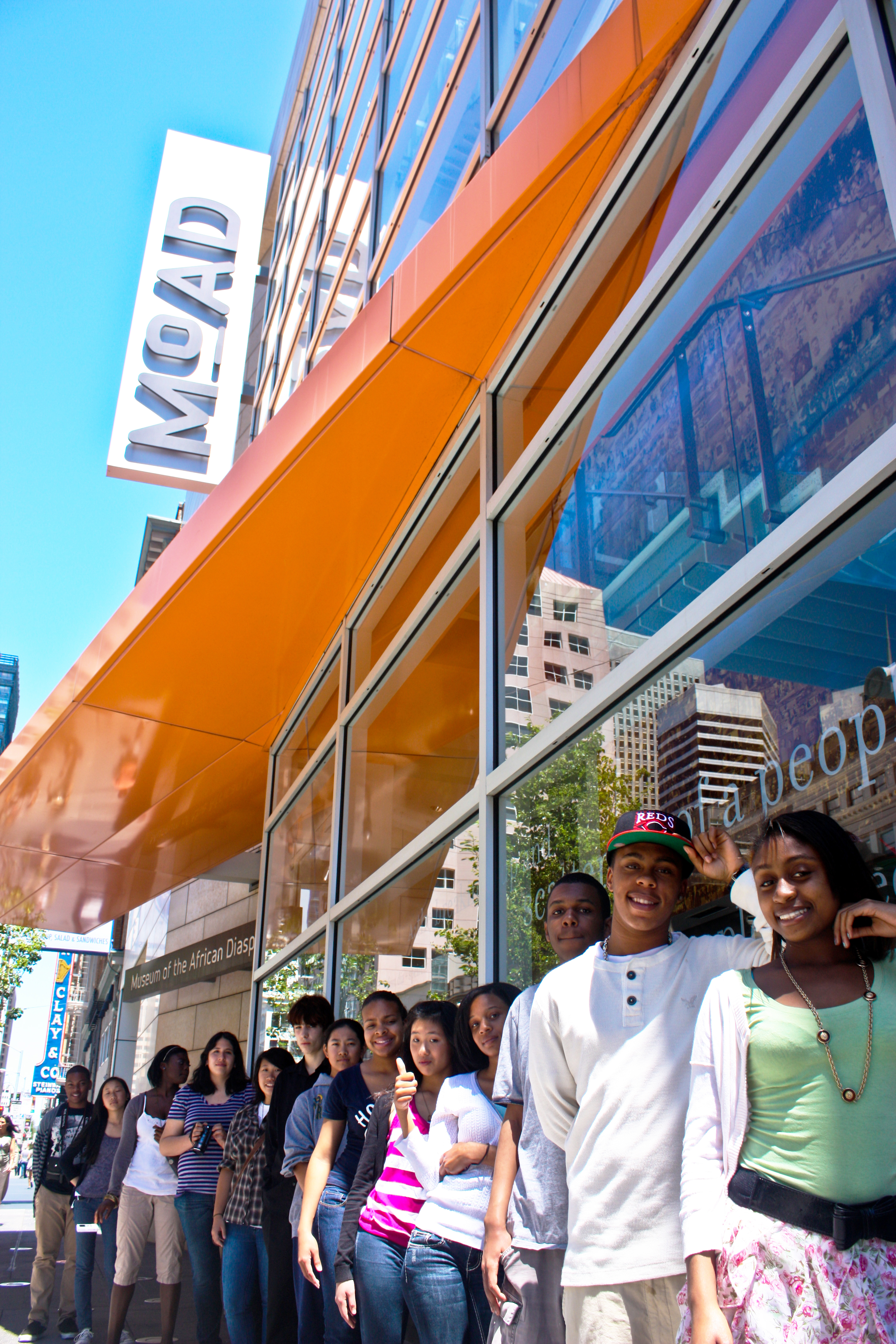
Museum of the African Diaspora, San Francisco

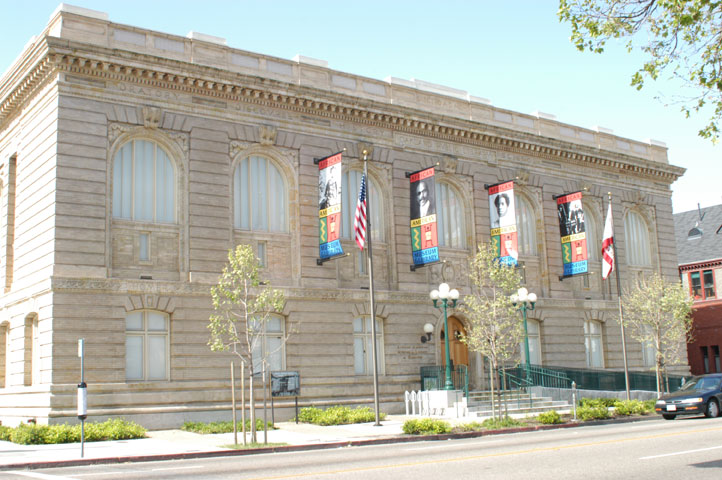
African American Museum and Library at Oakland (2008)

== Media ==
The first African American newspaper in California is thought to be the Mirror of the Times, published in the mid-1850s. Other early African American newspapers in Northern California included Pacific Appeal and The Elevator; and in Southern California included the California Eagle, California Voice, and Los Angeles Sentinel.

African American residents of California were first mentioned in 1919 by Black Californian historian Delilah Beasley, and later on Rudolph Lapp, others. More information appeared in journals such as The Journal of Negro History and The Journal of African American History. (3)

The largest film festival focused on black filmmaking is the Pan African Film Festival, founded in 1992. Other notable film festivals dedicated to enhancing the careers of Black filmmaking professionals include The San Diego Black Film Festival and the Hollywood Black Film Festival.

== Education ==
In May 1854, the private San Francisco Colored School was opened in the basement of St. Cyprian AME Church at Jackson and Virginia Streets in San Francisco, founded by John Jamison Moore (who also was the first teacher and principal) and led by Rev. Thomas Marcus Decatur Ward.

Elizabeth Thorn Scott Flood was an early African American educator in Sacramento starting in 1854, and she later taught in Oakland.

The Phoenixonian Institute of San Jose was the first high school for African American students in the state, it opened in 1861 as a private boarding school and closed in the mid-1870s when the state public schools were no longer segregated. The funding and support for the Phoenixonian Institute initially came from the California State Convention of Colored Citizens and the African American community on the West Coast.

In 1874, the California Supreme Court established the notion of "separate but equal" schools in Ward v. Flood. African American students in lower education increased from 24 pupils in 1870, to 183 pupils by the late 19th-century; and they ranked the highest performing students in literacy subjects in 1900.

The first university Black studies department in the United States was created at San Francisco State University, following the Third World Liberation Front strikes of 1968.

In 1994, California's African American students made up about seven percent of higher education, compared to nine percent in the country.

== Health ==
Black Californians have the highest death rates from breast, cervical, colorectal, lung, and prostate cancer. In 2022, Blacks in California have died at a higher rate than other ethnic groups in from COVID-19 and had the lowest COVID-19 vaccination rates. Blacks in California are more prone to obesity. Homicide rates are higher for African Americans in California.

Blacks in California are more likely to experience depression, psychological distress and other mental health conditions. The suicide rate is higher for Black Californians than white Californians.

== Reparations ==
California was the first state to consider reparations for Black residents, and the California Reparations Task Force was formed in order to present the state legislature its recommendations. Economists tell the state that Black Californians could be owed $800 billion in reparations. The $800bn is more than 2.5 times California's annual budget of $300 billion The statewide estimate includes $246 billion in compensation for eligible Black Californians whose neighborhoods were aggressively policed and prosecuted in the "war on drugs" from 1970 to 2020. That would be nearly $125,000 for each person who qualifies. Economists also included $569 billion in reparations for the discriminatory practice of redlining in housing loans. The compensation would be about $223,000 per eligible resident who lived in California from 1933 to 1977.

According to a 2023 poll from the UC Berkeley, the majority of California voters oppose cash reparations as a form of compensation to residents of the state who are the descendants of enslaved African Americans.

== Politics ==
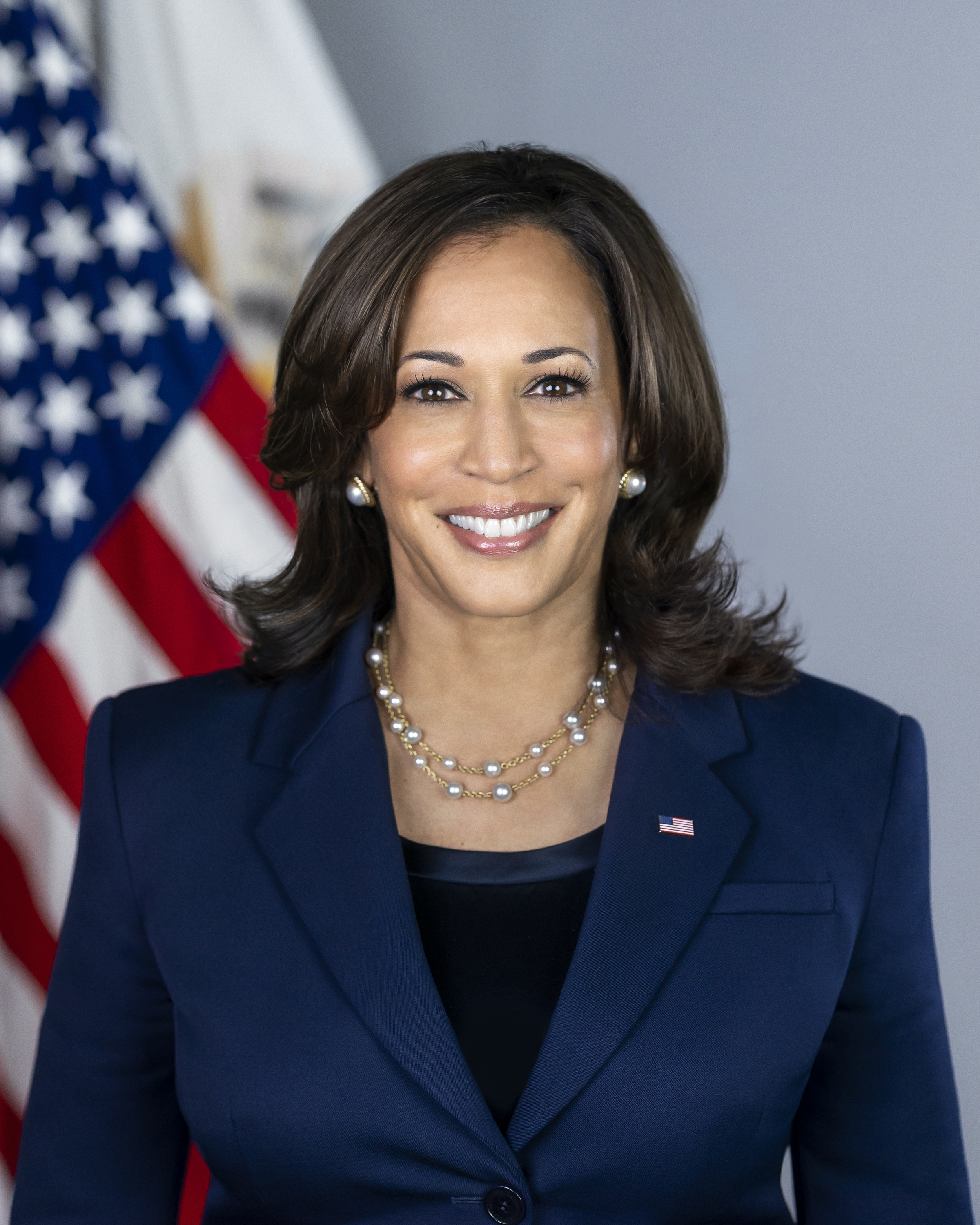
Kamala Harris

82% of African American voters are registered as Democrats in 2016. Kamala Harris is the first African American female Vice President, and she was born and raised in California.

86% of African American in California voted for Kamala Harris in an exit poll in 2024. 82% of African Americans in California voted for Joe Biden in an exit poll in 2020. 88% of African Americans in California voted for Hillary Clinton in 2016.

== Discrimination ==
Former California governor Peter Hardeman Burnett, a white man with ancestors who owned enslaved people, barred Black people from the state and ordered the killing of Native Americans because he believed in white supremacy and Manifest Destiny.

White supremacy has harmed African Americans and Native Americans in California. During European colonization, African Americans were enslaved, while Native Americans were killed during the California genocide.

In 2021, the total number of hate crime events reported is the sixth-highest-ever-recorded, and the highest since the aftermath of September 11, 2001. According to a study by the California Department of Justice (DOJ), anti-Black hate crimes from 2021 to 2022 increased in the state by 27%; with all-over hate crimes also increasing by 20%.

African-Americans have higher arrest rates than white people in California's 58 counties. African Americans are often victims of racial profiling in California.

California became the first state to ban discrimination based on natural Black hair and hairstyles. The bill was signed into law by Gavin Newsom in 2019.

California banned interracial marriages between African-Americans and white people on May 5, 1943.

California also once denied education to black people and segregated them from white children.

== Culture ==
African-Americans introduced West Coast hip-hop to California's music scene, a large regional genre in the hip-hop scene, emphasizing laid-back beats and a relaxed vibe, and is associated with artists such as Tupac Shakur and Snoop Dogg. The genre's cultural impact gave rise to the East Coast-West Coast hip-hop rivalry, a mid-1990s feud, primarily influenced by the conflict between Bad Boy Records and Death Row Records. Notable hip-hop artists from the region include Kendrick Lamar, Snoop Dogg, Ice Cube, Eazy-E, Dr. Dre, Schoolboy Q and Tyga.

African Americans brought soul food to California primarily through the Second Great Migration, and has since evolved into a unique cuisine. California's agricultural abundance and cultural diversity influenced variations of traditional Southern dishes, incorporating fresh produce and regional ingredients.

== Demographics ==
Racial/ethnic makeup of California, treating Hispanics as a separate category (2017)
1. White Non-Hispanic (37.0%)
2. Black Non-Hispanic (5.47%)
3. Native American Non-Hispanic (0.37%)
4. Asian Non-Hispanic (14.4%)
5. Pacific Islander Non-Hispanic (0.35%)
6. Other Non-Hispanic (0.27%)
7. Two or more races Non-Hispanic (3.05%)
8. Hispanic Any Race (39.1%)
0.27% of Hispanics identify as Black

In the 2020 Census, 2,237,044 California residents were identified as African American (of the total 39,538,223). In 1 of the state's 58 counties, African Americans make up more than 10% of the population: Solano (13.7%). African Americans in the seven counties of Los Angeles (794,364), San Bernardino (184,558), Alameda (164,879), Riverside (156,477), San Diego (155,813), Sacramento (152,795), and Contra Costa (101,485) make up more than 76% of all African Americans in the state.

Ancestry by origin, 2018	Number	%
(Cape Verde) Cape Verdeans	1,462	
(Ethiopia) Ethiopians	33,538	
(Ghana) Ghanaians	4,854	
(Kenya) Kenyans	3,228	
(Liberia) Liberians	2,415	
(Nigeria) Nigerians	36,415	
(Sierra Leone) Sierra Leoneans	1,278	
(Somalia) Somalis	5,022	
(South Africa) South Africans	3,376	
(Sudan) Sudanese	3,538	
(Uganda) Ugandans	1,710	
(Zimbabwe) Zimbabweans	408	
African	110,116	
Other African	10,287	

=== History ===
Racial or Ethnic group	1850	1860	1870	1880	1890	1900	1910	1920	1930	1940	1950	1960	1970	1980	1990	2000	2010	2020
Black	1.0%	1.1%	0.8%	0.7%	0.9%	0.7%	0.9%	1.1%	1.4%	1.8%	4.4%	5.6%	7.0%	7.7%	7.4%	6.7%	6.2%	5.7%
Total Population

=== LGBT community ===
The state has 55,000 Black lesbians, gay black men and black bisexuals.

== List of notable historic sites ==
=== Los Angeles ===
- First African Methodist Episcopal Church of Los Angeles, Los Angeles
- Somerville Hotel, Los Angeles

=== Oakland ===
- Beth Eden Baptist Church, Oakland
- Liberty Hall, Oakland
- North Oakland Missionary Baptist Church, Oakland

=== San Francisco ===
- Bethel African Methodist Episcopal Church, San Francisco
- First African Methodist Episcopal Zion Church, San Francisco
- Third Baptist Church, San Francisco

=== Other ===
- Allensworth Historic District, Allensworth
- California State Convention of Colored Citizens
- Moses Rodgers House, Stockton
- Sugg House, Sonora

== List of notable Black Californians ==
- Jhené Aiko
- Anthony Anderson
- Mara Brock Akil
- Mahershala Ali
- Tyra Banks
- Karen Bass
- Barry Bonds
- Lisa Bonet
- Golden Brooks
- Blueface
- Reggie Bush
- Nick Cannon
- Doja Cat
- Ice Cube
- Angela Davis
- George Washington Dennis
- Snoop Dogg
- Marqueece Harris-Dawson
- Dr. Dre
- Aunjanue Ellis
- MC Hammer
- James Harden
- Kamala Harris
- H.E.R.
- Emerson Etem
- Paul George
- Mifflin Wistar Gibbs
- Tyrese Gibson
- Danny Glover
- Meagan Good
- Devin Haney
- Etta James
- Dwayne Johnson
- Anne-Marie Johnson
- Rashida Jones
- Zoë Kravitz
- Regina King
- Kehlani
- Chandler Kinney
- Steve Lacy
- Kendrick Lamar
- Peter Lester
- Lauren London
- Nia Long
- Eva Marcille
- Miguel
- A. J. McKee
- Cheryl Miller
- Reggie Miller
- Justin Morrison
- Shane Mosley
- Frank Ocean
- Kyla Pratt
- Karyn Parsons
- Paula Patton
- Issa Rae
- Willy T. Ribbs
- Lela Rochon
- Wendy Raquel Robinson
- Tracee Ellis Ross
- Khalil Rountree Jr.
- RuPaul
- Saweetie
- Rachel Scott
- Kofi Siriboe
- Pebbles
- Scorpio Sky
- Carolynne Snowden
- Hailee Steinfeld
- Lakeith Stanfield
- Vince Staples
- Meghan, Duchess of Sussex
- Tinashe
- Karrueche Tran
- Bertha L. Turner
- Jalin Turner
- Tyga
- Tyler, The Creator
- Terri J. Vaughn
- Maxine Waters
- Jody Watley
- Russell Westbrook
- Jessica Williams
- Haji Wright
- Camille Winbush
- Jaleel White
- Tiger Woods
- YG
- Nick Young
- Gyasi Zardes
- Zendaya
Notable Black Californian entertainers

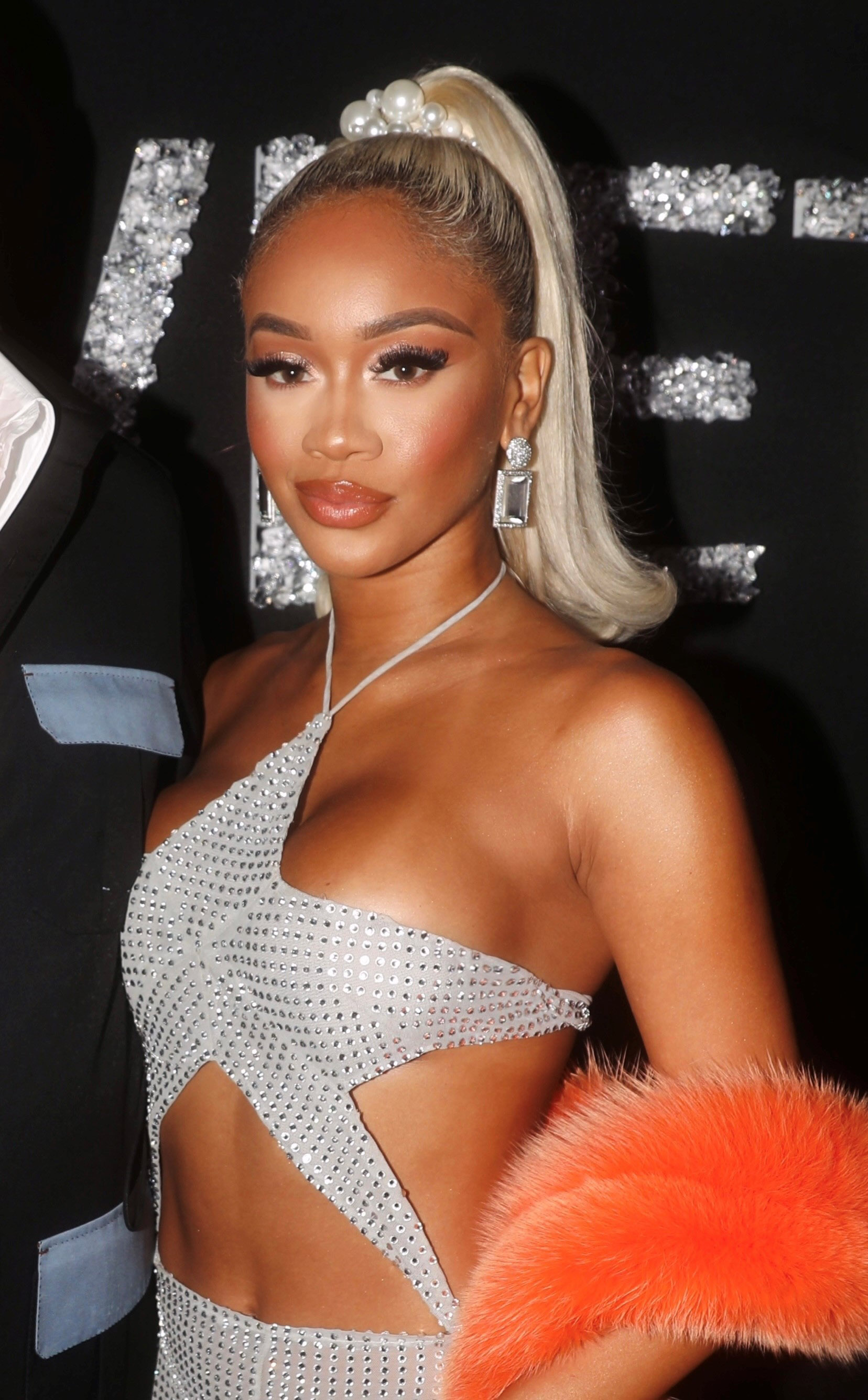
Saweetie is of African, Chinese and Filipino descent from Northern California

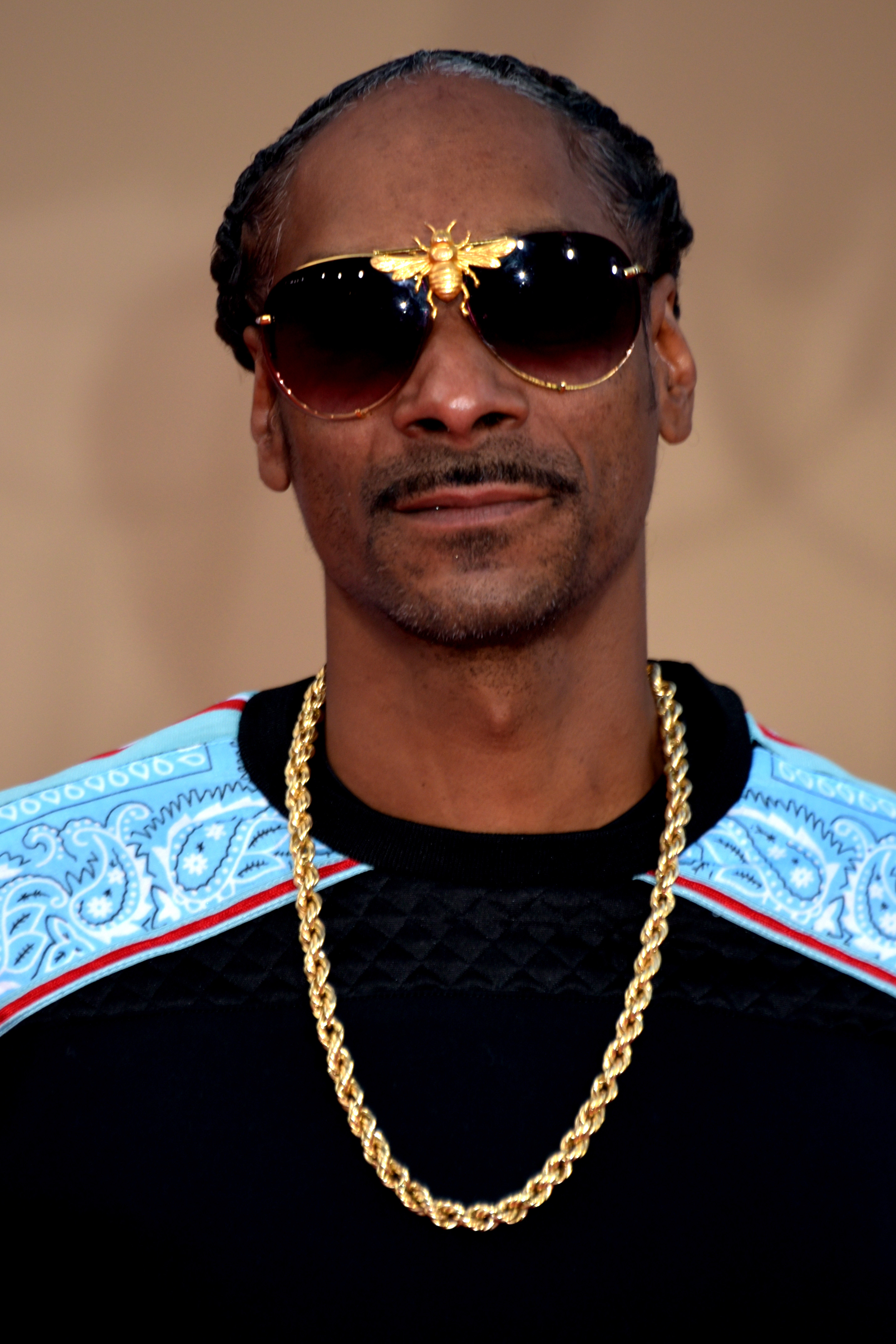
Snoop Dogg (2019) from Long Beach

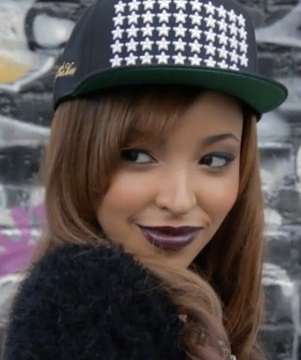
Tinashe is of Zimbabwean, Danish, Norwegian and Irish descent from Los Angeles

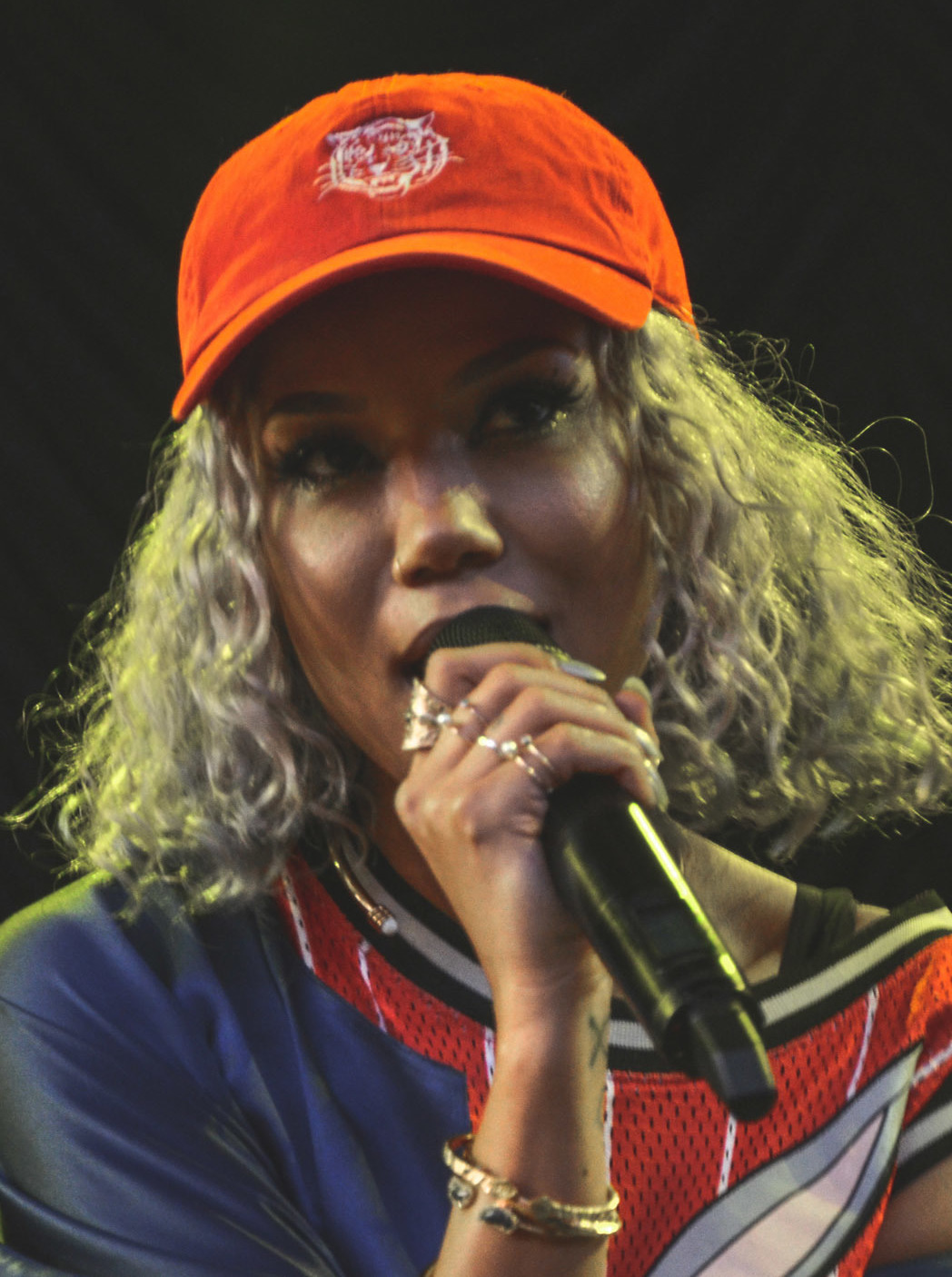
Jhené Aiko is of Spanish, Dominican, Japanese, Native American, African, and German-Jewish descent from Los Angeles
Notable Black Californian politicians and political leaders

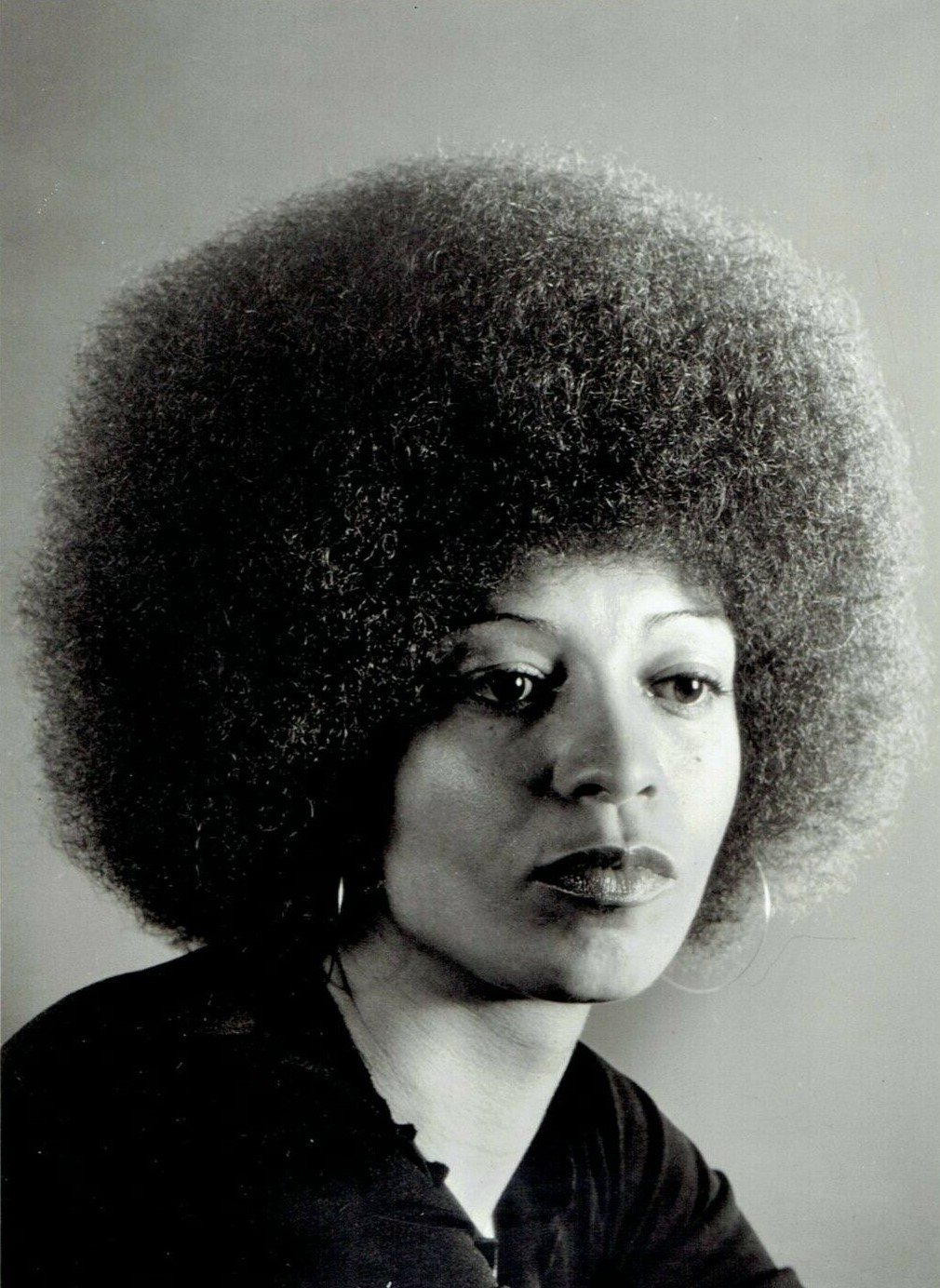
Angela Davis (1974)

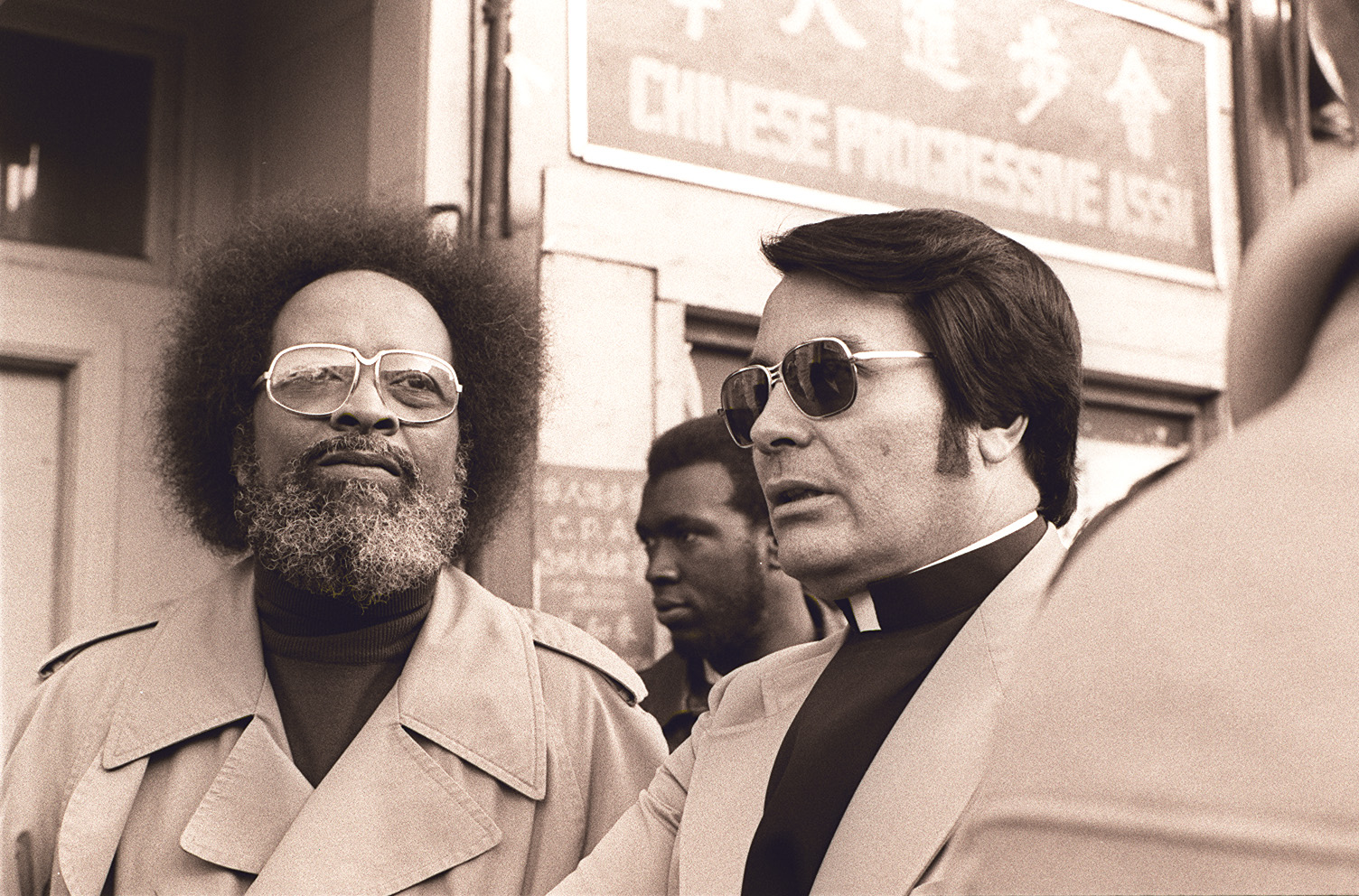
Rev. Cecil Williams with Rev. Jim Jones (1977) at a protest, in front of the International Hotel in San Francisco

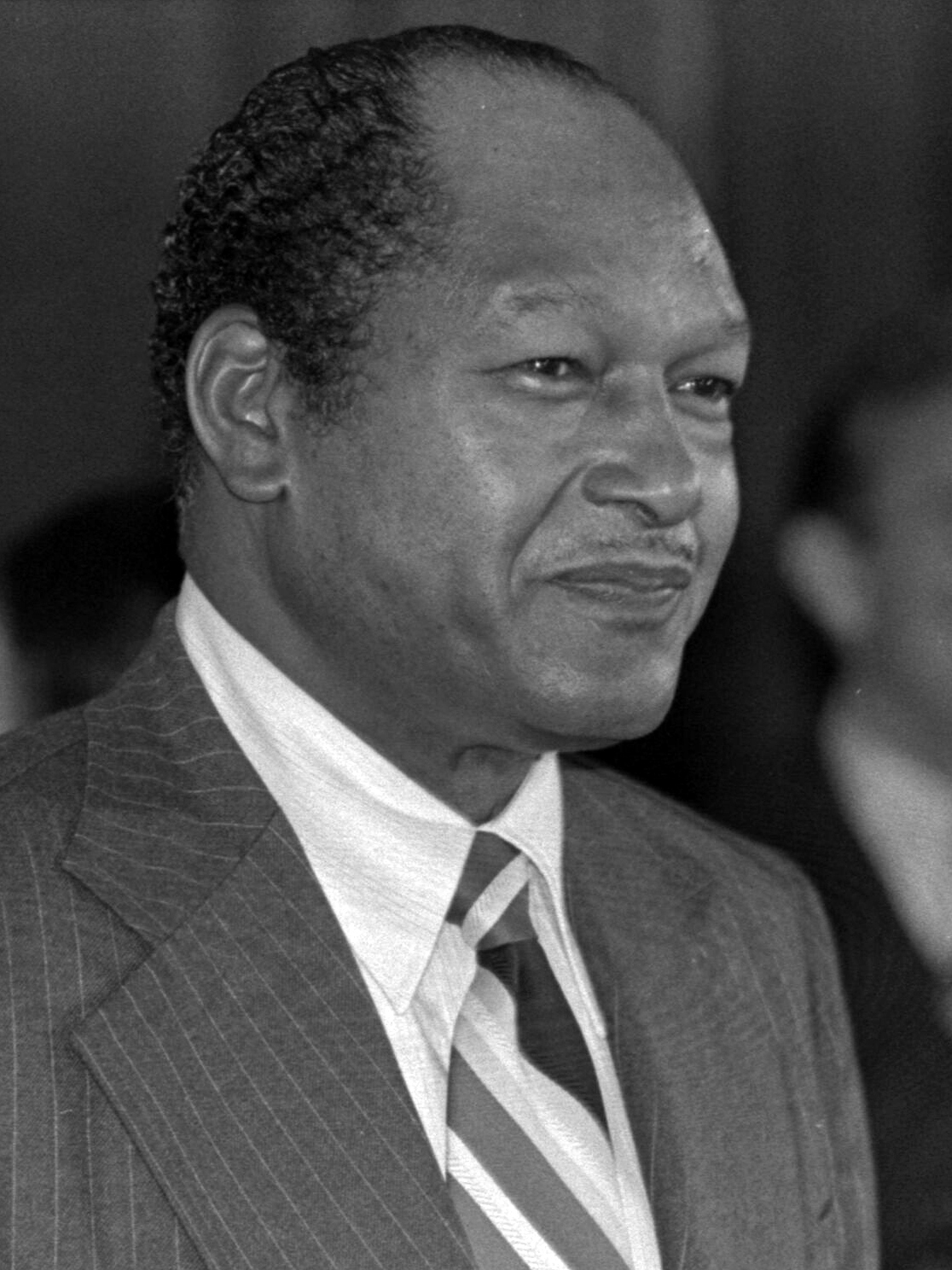
Tom Bradley (1984), former mayor of Los Angeles

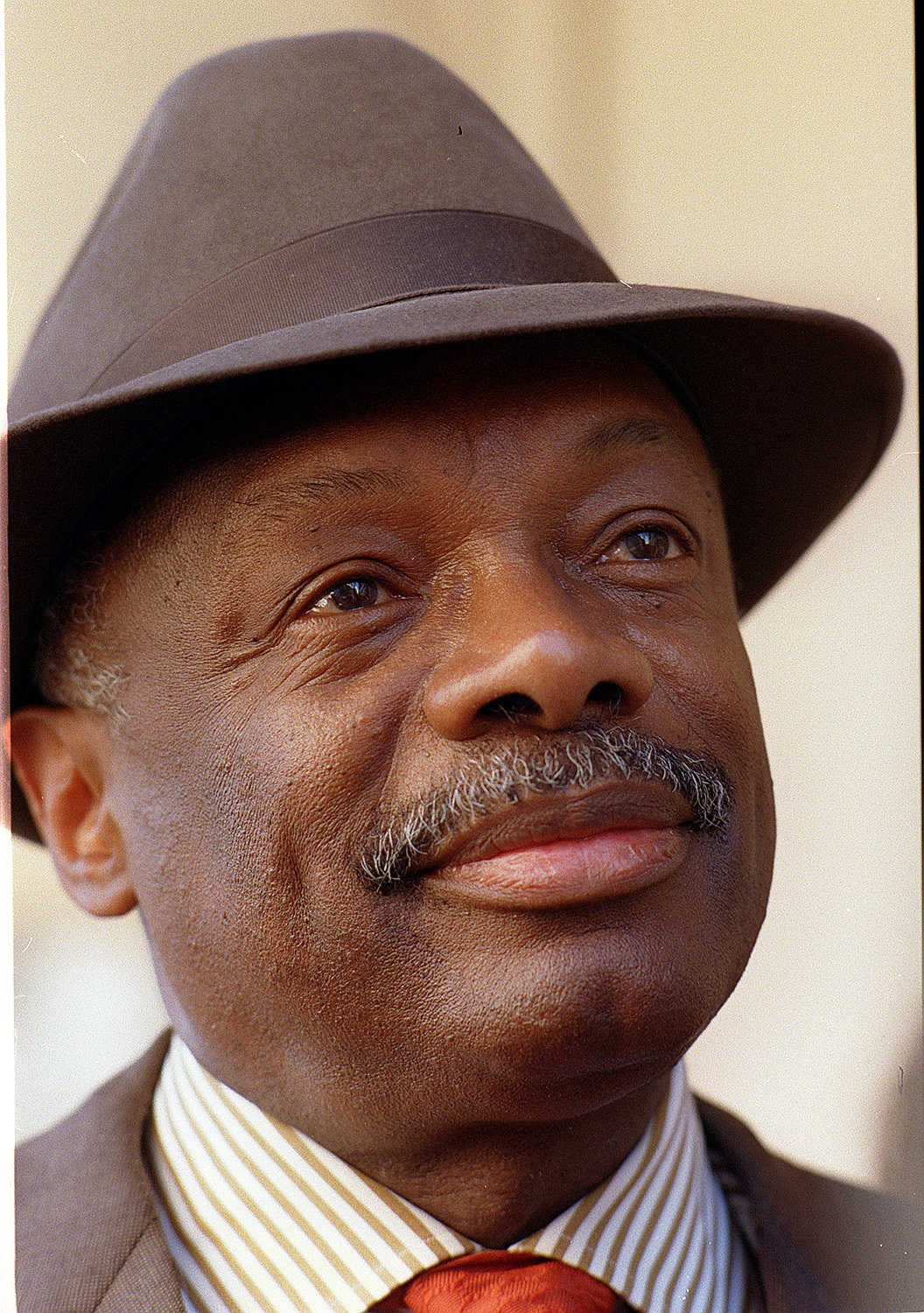
Willie Brown (1999), former mayor of San Francisco

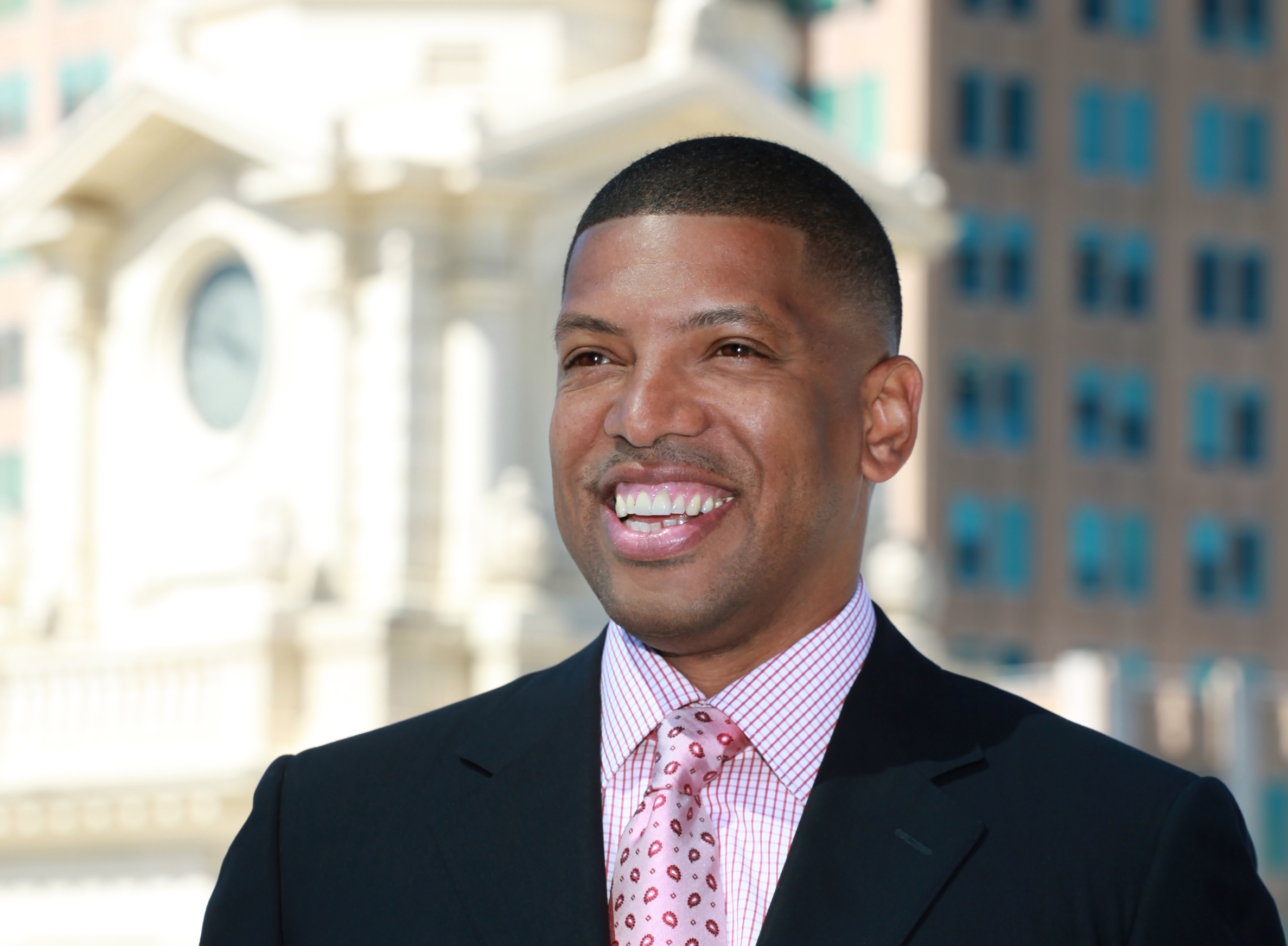
Kevin Johnson (2011), former mayor of Sacramento and basketball player

Kamala Harris (2021), 49th Vice President of the United States

== Gallery ==
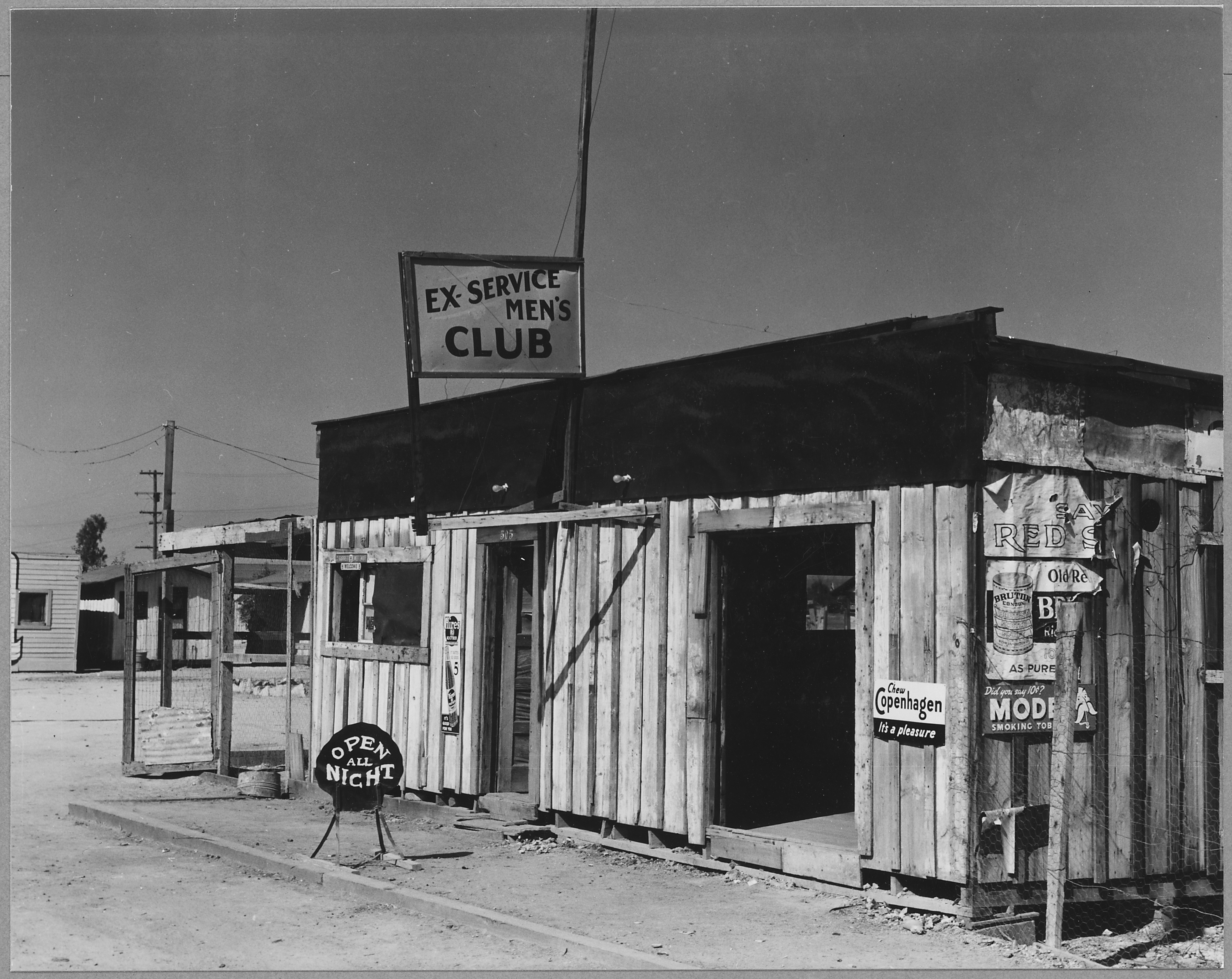
"Ex-Service Men's Club" (1940), an African American bar in Sunset District in East Bakersfield, Kern County, California

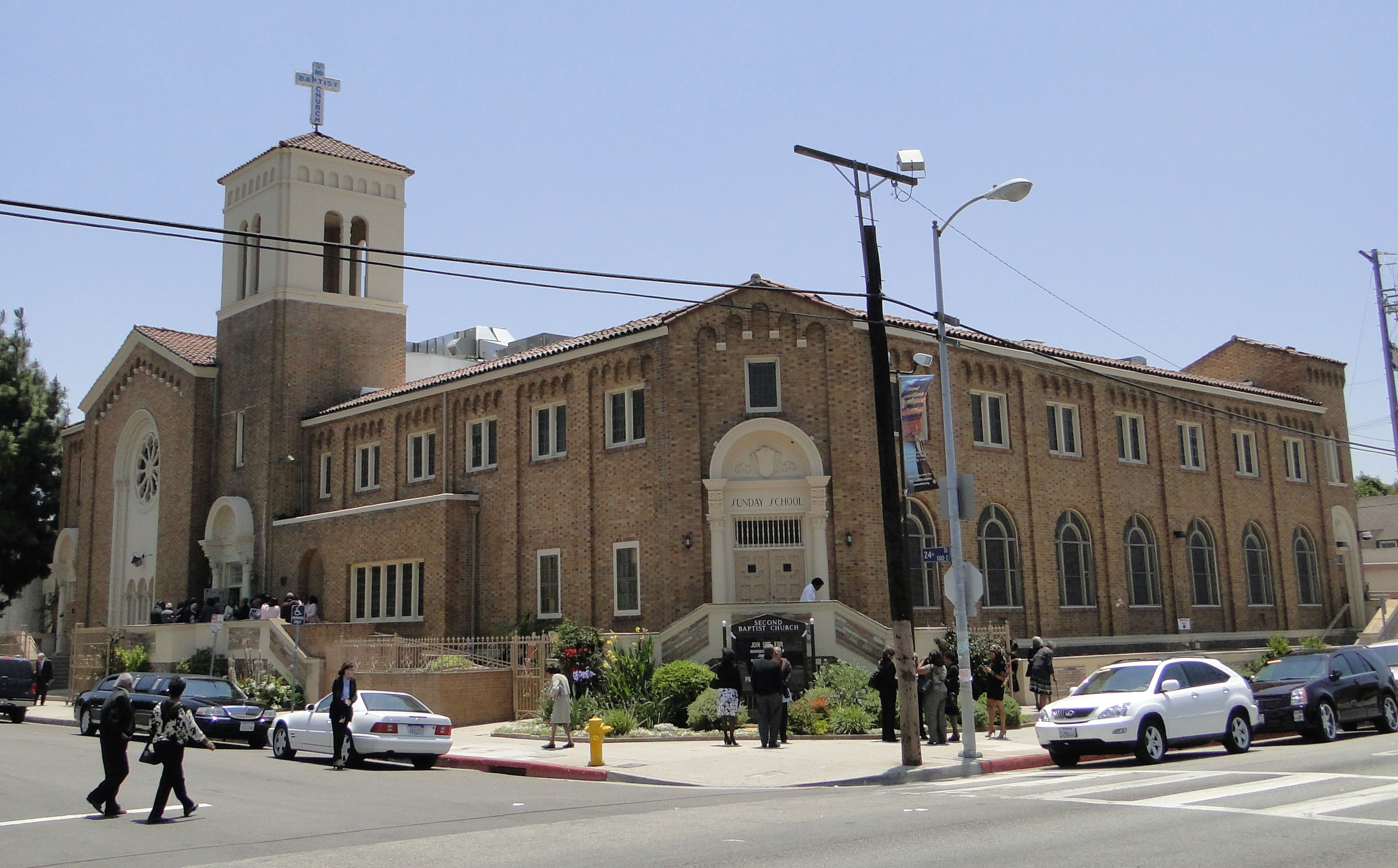
Second Baptist Church is an African American church in California.

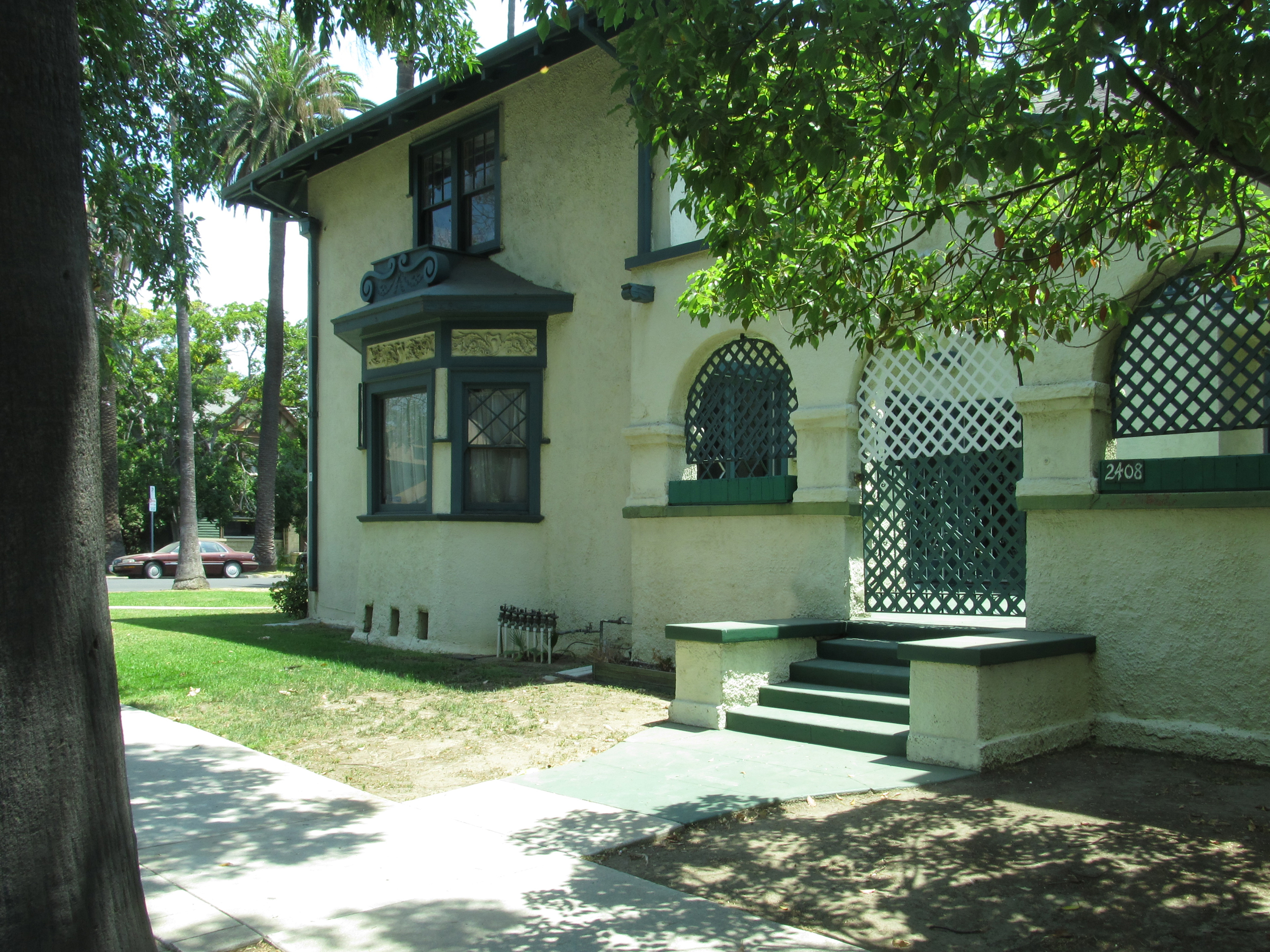

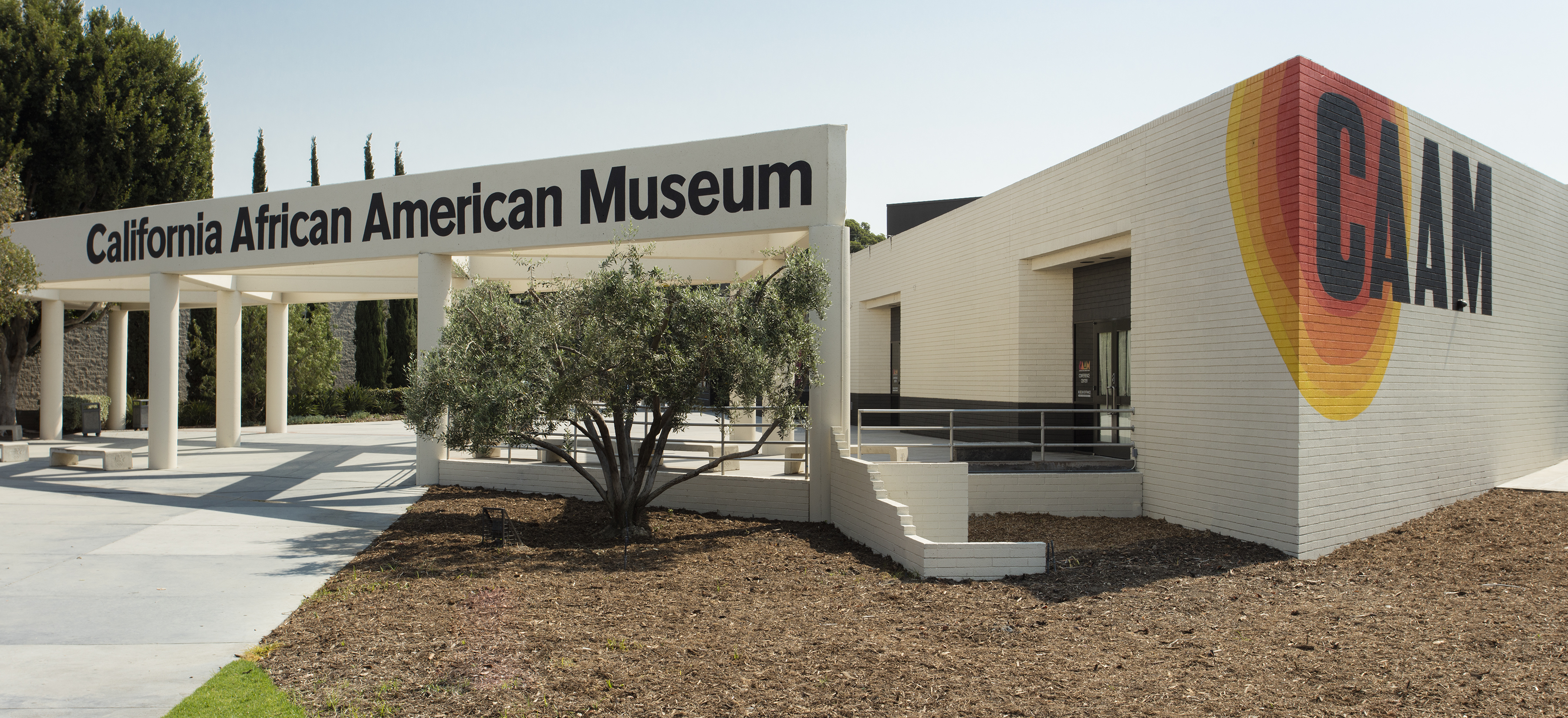

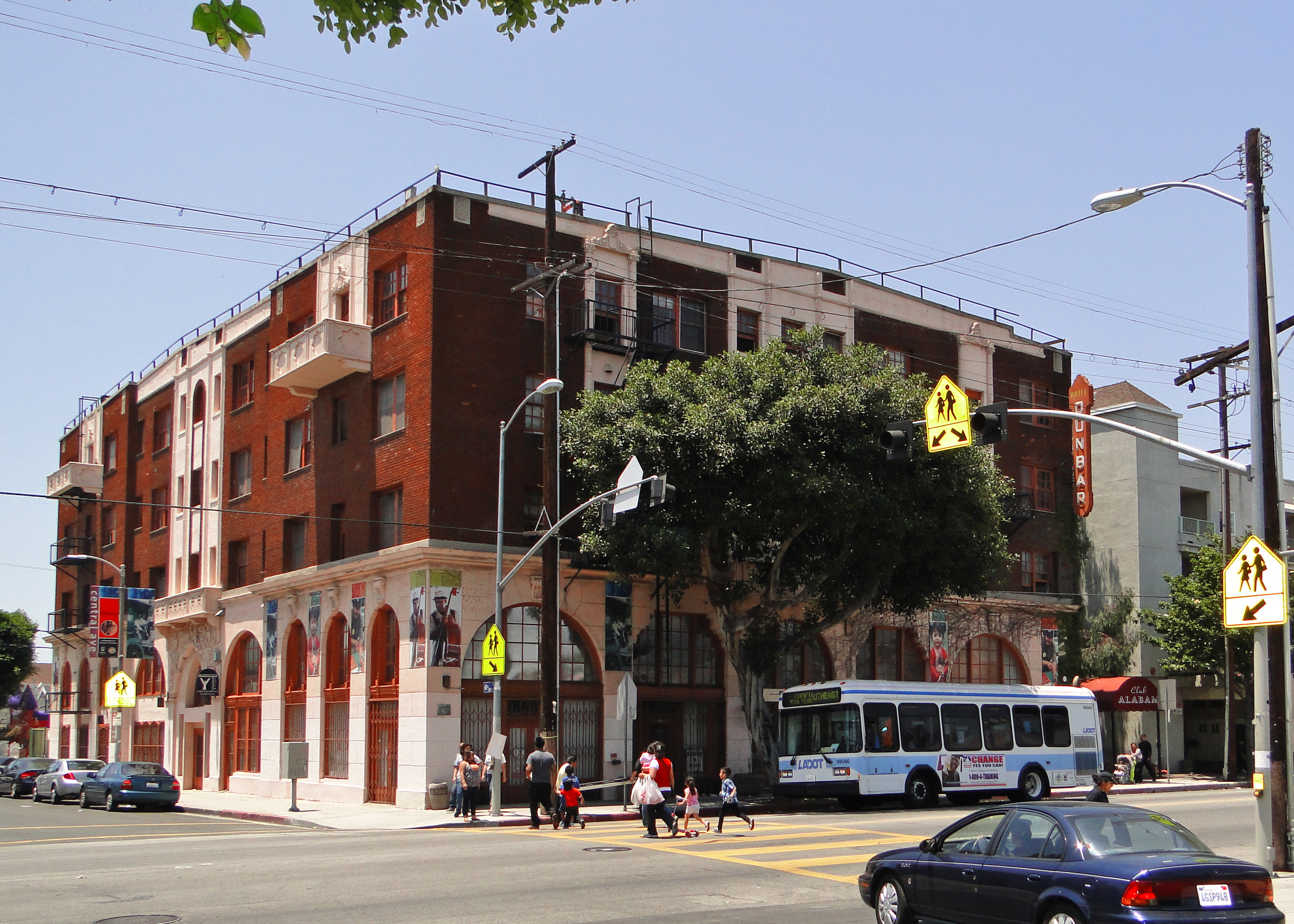

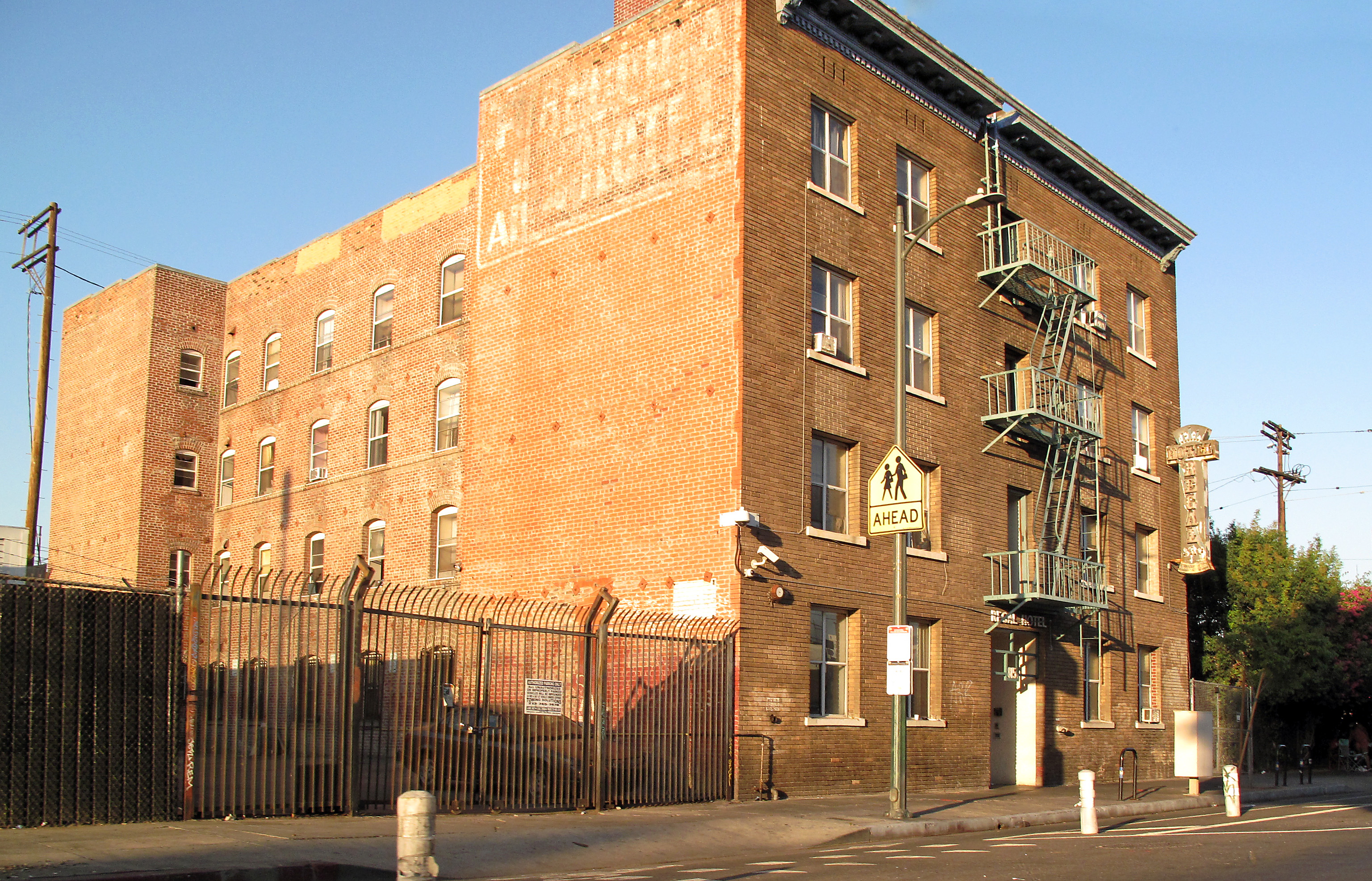

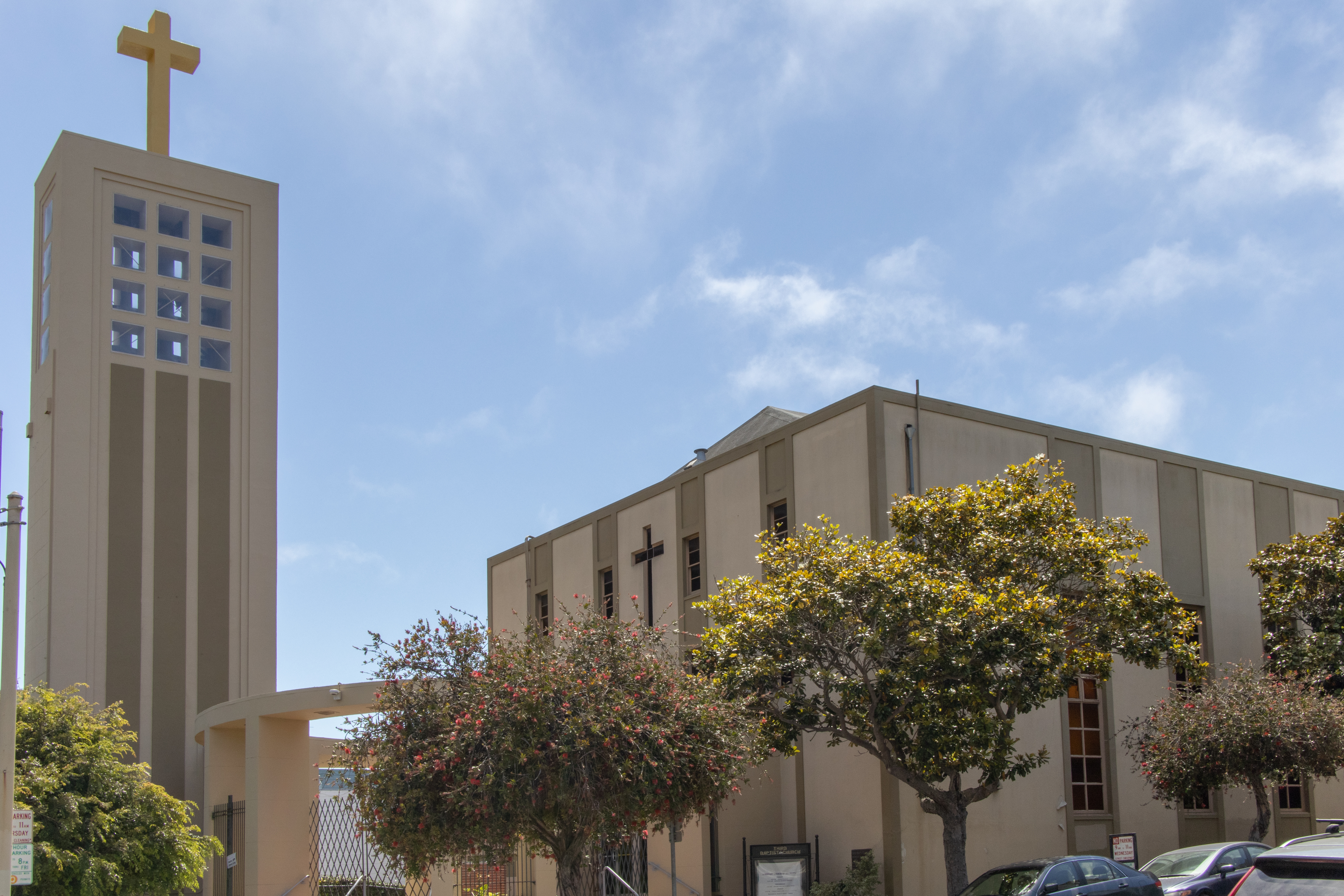

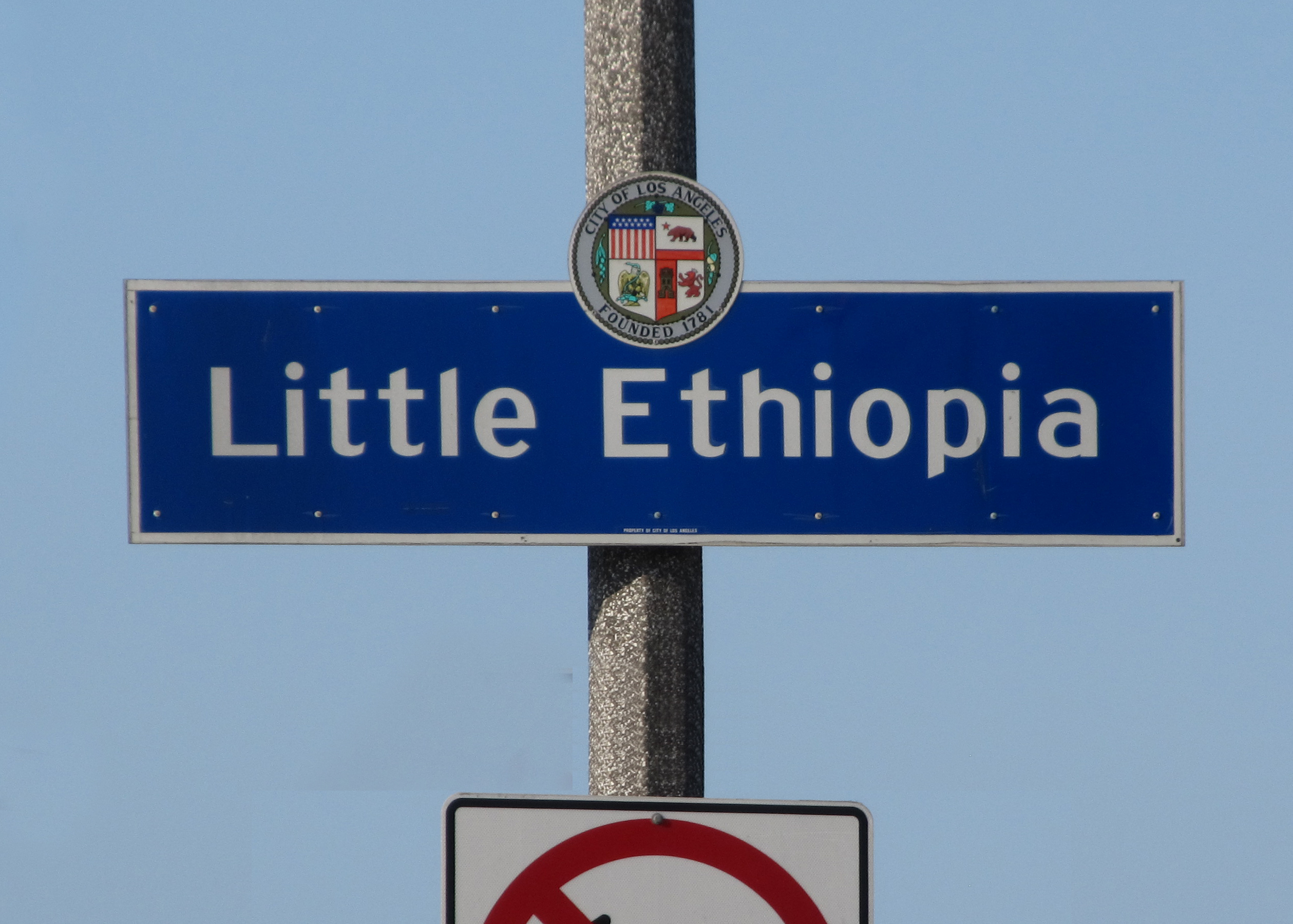

== See also ==
- Bibliography of Los Angeles
- Bibliography of California history
- Demographics of California
- History of African Americans in Los Angeles
- African Americans in San Francisco
- African Americans in the East Bay (San Francisco Bay Area)
- Black Southerners
- California locations by race
- Little Ethiopia
- White Americans in California
- Blaxican
- Afro-Mexicans
- Spanish California
- Hispanics and Latinos in California
- African Americans in Oregon
- History of African Americans in Texas
- African Americans in Georgia
- African Americans in Oklahoma
- African Americans in Louisiana
- Indigenous peoples of California
- Asian Americans in California
- History of California
- Mexicans in California
- Californios
- Basque Americans in California
