= Bethel African Methodist Episcopal Church (San Francisco) =

Historic church in San Francisco, California

- Bethel A.M.E. Church
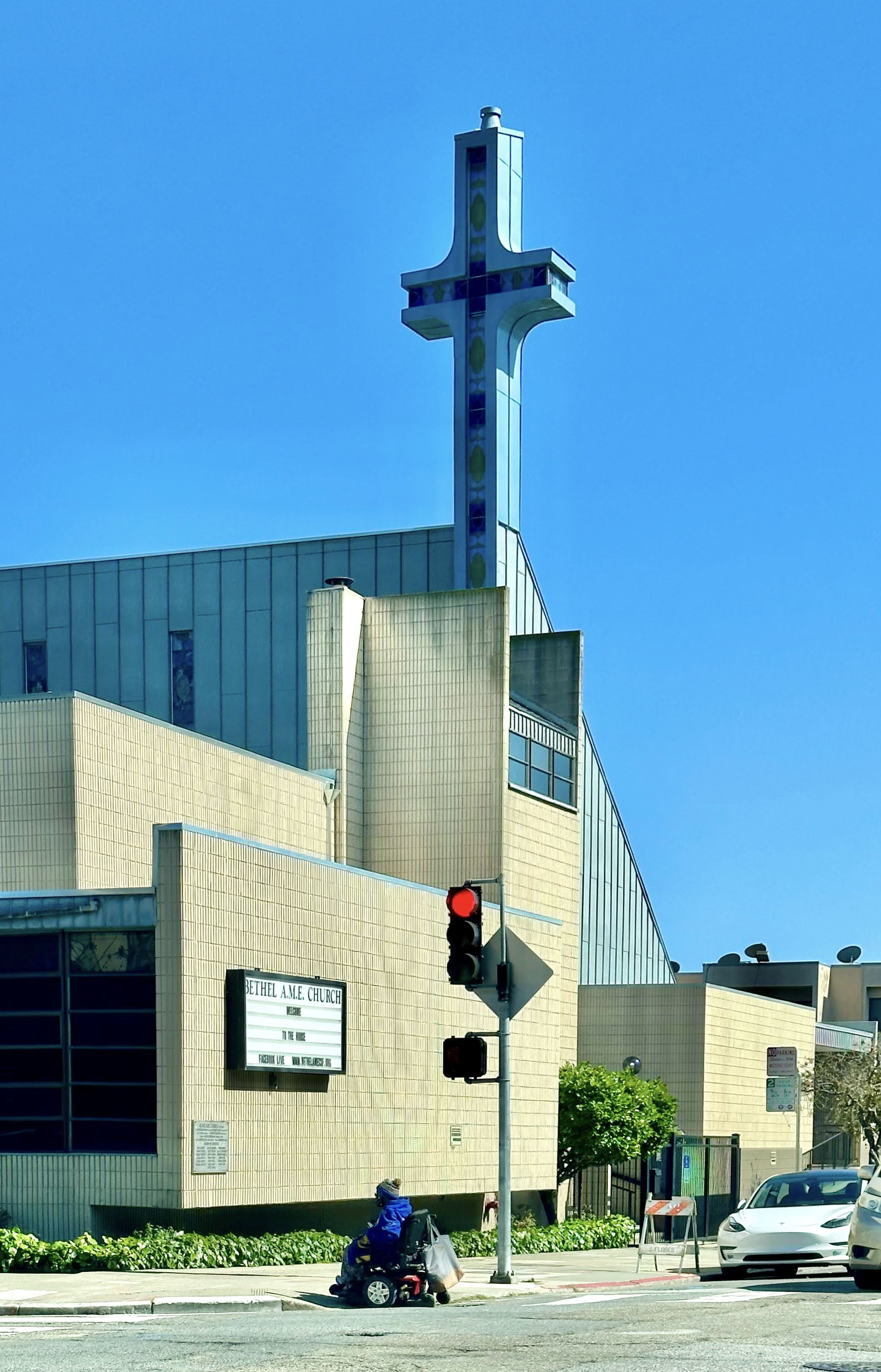
- Bethel African Methodist Episcopal Church
- 37.779980°N 122.426651°W
- Location: 916 Laguna Street, San Francisco, California, U.S.
- Country: United States
- Website: www.bethelamecsf.org

History
- Former name(s): St. Cyprian's African M. E. Church; Second African M. E. Church; Union Bethel A.M.E. Church
- Founded: 1852; 174 years ago

Bethel African Methodist Episcopal Church (Bethel AME Church) is a historic African American church founded in 1852 and is located in the Fillmore District in San Francisco, California. It was one of the earliest African American churches in the west. Over the course of its history, the church met in multiple locations throughout San Francisco and was known by several different names at various times.

== History ==
Over the years numerous influential people have visited this church to speak with the congregation, including Ida B. Wells, Benjamin W. Arnett, Adam Clayton Powell Sr., Paul Robeson, W. E. B. DuBois, Mary McLeod Bethune, James Weldon Johnson, and Booker T. Washington.

Bethel AME Church was connected to the Grace Episcopal Chapel (formerly Little Grace, and now known as Grace Cathedral, founded c. 1849), as well as the Saint Andrews African Methodist Episcopal Church of Sacramento (founded in 1850). This church is one of three Black churches founded in 1852 in San Francisco, the other two are the Third Baptist Church, and First AME Zion Church.

Bethel AME Church was founded in 1852 by Rev. Charles Stewart and Edward Gomez, and was then-called St. Cyprian's African Methodist Episcopal Church. The first pastor was Rev. Joseph Thompson was replaced by the more experienced missionary pastor, Rev. Thomas Marcus Decatur Ward from Philadelphia. The early years had Bethel AME Church holding services in numerous locations in the city, including on Jackson Street, Washington Street, and Green Street. In May 1854, the church under Ward's leadership and under John Jamison Moore's founding and teaching, opened up a small school in the basement for African American students who were not allowed to attend public schools in California. The first year, 23 students attended the school. In 1872, the California Supreme Court ruled Ward v. Floor current segregation in educational practices as unconstitutional, breaching U.S. Constitution's Fourteenth and Fifteenth amendments.

The third California State Convention of Colored Citizens (CSCCC) event was held on October 13–?, 1857 at St. Cyprian's African Methodist Episcopal Church in San Francisco, a church led by Rev. Ward.

The Little Grace building (formerly used by the Grace Episcopal Chapel) was built at 1207 Powell Street near Jackson; from 1862 until 1894, Bethel AME Church occupied the Little Grace building (and the church was then called Union Bethel A.M.E. Church). In 1868, after Rev. Ward left, many members of this congregation left to form the Pilgrim AME Church under the leadership of Jeremiah Burke Sanderson, a friend of Rev. Ward. Starting in 1894, the Bethel AME Church was rebuilt.

During the 50th anniversary Golden Jubilee in 1901, speakers and guests included Rev. Willam Ford Nichols, Rev. F. Grant Snelson, Mary W. Kincaid, Rev. F. P. R. Green, Rev. Milton D. Buck, Rev. F. D. Bovard, Rev. William Rader, George Littlefield, Rev. Walter M. White, and Rev. Bishop Benjamin W. Arnett (of Ohio).

After the 1906 San Francisco earthquake and fire, the church was destroyed. Many of the congregation had moved to Oakland after the event, and Rev. A. A. Burleigh was pastor. It took many years to start to rebuild again, and the new church building was finished in 1913. Not much was documented between 1906 and 1944.

On January 21, 1945, the church was moved to its present location at 916 Laguna Street and was renamed to Bethel African Methodist Episcopal Church and Rev. C. D. Tolliver was pastor.

The Fellowship Manor Of Bethel AME Church is senior housing associated with the church, and located at 1201 Golden Gate Avenue. The E. F. Joseph Photograph Collection at Oakland Public Library holds in their archives an image from 1929 of the church choir.

== Pastors ==
- Rev. Joseph Thompson (1852–1852)
- Rev. Thomas Marcus Decatur Ward (c. 1852–1868)
- Rev. Obediah Summers (1891–c. 1894)
- Rev. Ezekial T. Cottonman (1894–?)
- Rev. A. A. Burleigh (1906–?)
- Rev. C. D. Tolliver (1945–1949)
- Rev. C. Wayne Love (1949–?)
- Rev. J. Austell Hall (1968–1972)
- Rev. Howard S. Gloyd (?–1987)
- Rev. Cecil Whitney Howard (1988–1992)
- Rev. “J” Edgar Boyd (1992–2012)
- Rev. John J. Hunter (2012)
- Rev. Philip R. Cousin Jr.
- Rev. Dr. Tyrone Hicks
- Rev. Robert Ryland Shaw II (2017–2023)
- Rev. Cecil L. Williams Jr. (2023–present)

== See also ==
- African Americans in California
- African Americans in San Francisco
- Colored Conventions Movement
- Phoenixonian Institute
- First African Methodist Episcopal Church (Oakland, California)
