= Obediah Summers =

American minister, Civil War veteran, chaplain (1844–1896)

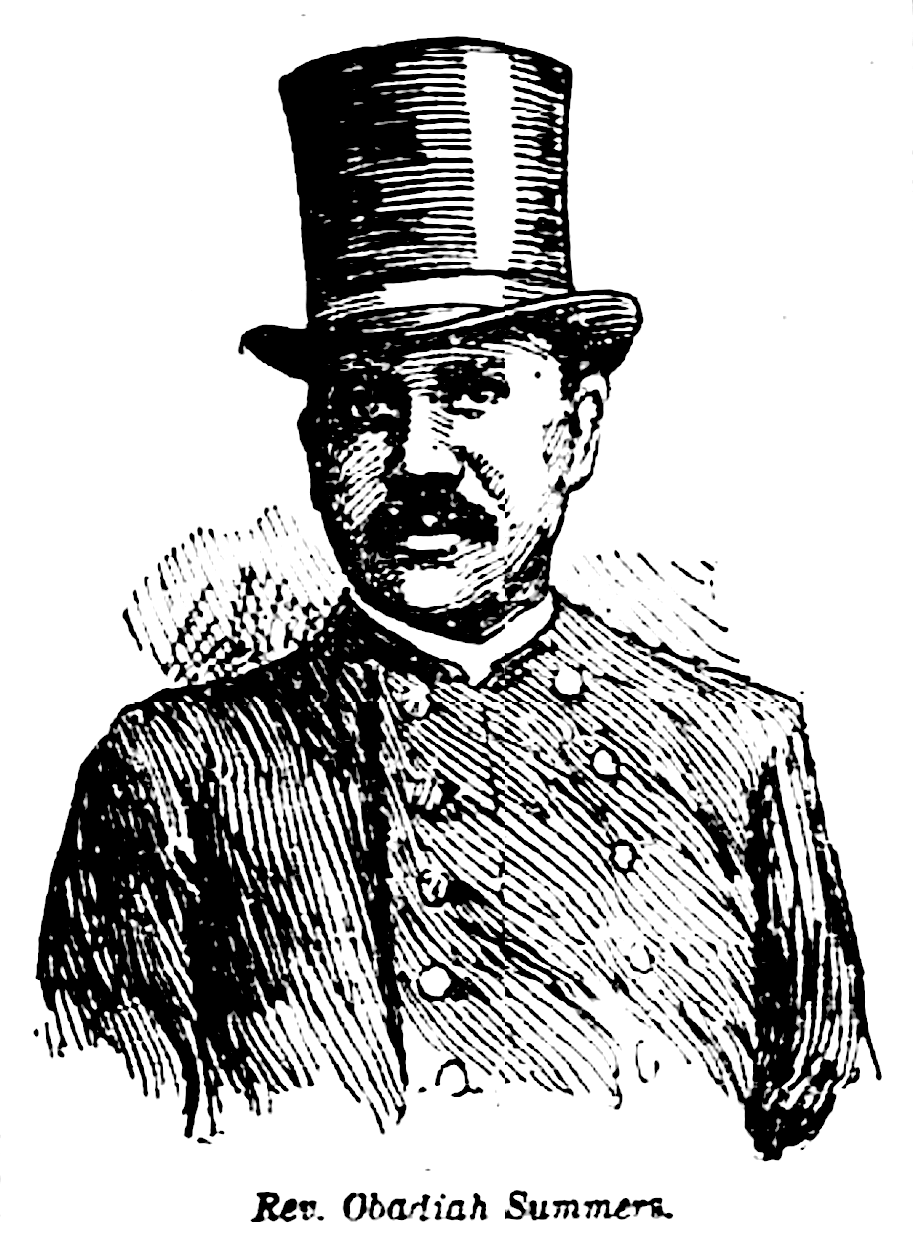
- Born: 1844; Clay County, Missouri, United States
- Died: March 15, 1896 (aged 51–52); Oakland, California, United States
- Burial place: Mountain View Cemetery, Oakland, California, United States
- Other names: Obediah Sommers, Obadiah Summers, Obidiah Summers
- Occupation(s): Minister, war veteran
- Spouse: Elizabeth L. Banks (m. 1871–1896; his death)
- Children: 7

Rev. Obediah Summers (1844 – 1896), was an American minister, an American Civil War veteran, and chaplain. He was born enslaved, and briefly worked in servitude within the Confederate States Army, before electing to join the Union Army. Summers served as the pastor at Bethel African Methodist Episcopal Church in San Francisco, California at the end of the 19th century. He later served as the California State Legislature as its first Black chaplain. His name was also spelled as Obadiah Summers, and Obidiah Summers.

== Biography ==
Obediah Summers was born into slavery in 1844, in Clay County, Missouri.

He was forced by his enslaver to serve as his "servant" for the Confederate States Army during the American Civil War. In 1862, Summers was captured at the Battle of Marshfield (in Marshfield, Missouri) by the Union Army, and he choose to serve in company A, in the 18th United States Colored Infantry Regiment.

In 1884, Summers worked for the AME church in Nebraska, and was transferred to Marysville, California. Summers moved in 1891 to Oakland, California, and opened the Old Bethel Church on 15th Street. From 1891 to 1894, he served as the pastor at Bethel African Methodist Episcopal Church in San Francisco, California.

He served as the first Black chaplain for the California State Legislature, during the thirty-first session of the assembly in 1895.

== Death and burial ==
He died on March 15, 1896, in Oakland, after an issue with his liver. He is buried at Mountain View Cemetery in Oakland, and was initially placed in a section of the cemetery that was not well funded, and his headstone was misspelled as "O. Sommers".

In 2003–2004, Dennis Evanosky, an Oakland writer, and historian, worked together with Summers' great granddaughter, Myra Adams, to provide him a proper burial. Summers received a new headstone from the U.S. federal government, and it was placed in the Grand Army of the Republic plot reserved for Civil War veterans.

== See also ==
- African Americans in San Francisco
- African Americans in the East Bay (San Francisco Bay Area)
- California State Convention of Colored Citizens
