= First African Methodist Episcopal Zion Church, San Francisco =

American church congregation in California (1852–present)

First African Methodist Episcopal Zion Church
- Starr King Methodist Church; Stockton Street AME Zion Church
- First African Methodist Episcopal Zion Church
- 37.777686°N 122.446065°W
- Location: 2159 Golden Gate Ave., San Francisco, California, U.S.
- Denomination: African Methodist Episcopal Zion Church

History
- Founded: August 1852
- Founder: John Jamison Moore

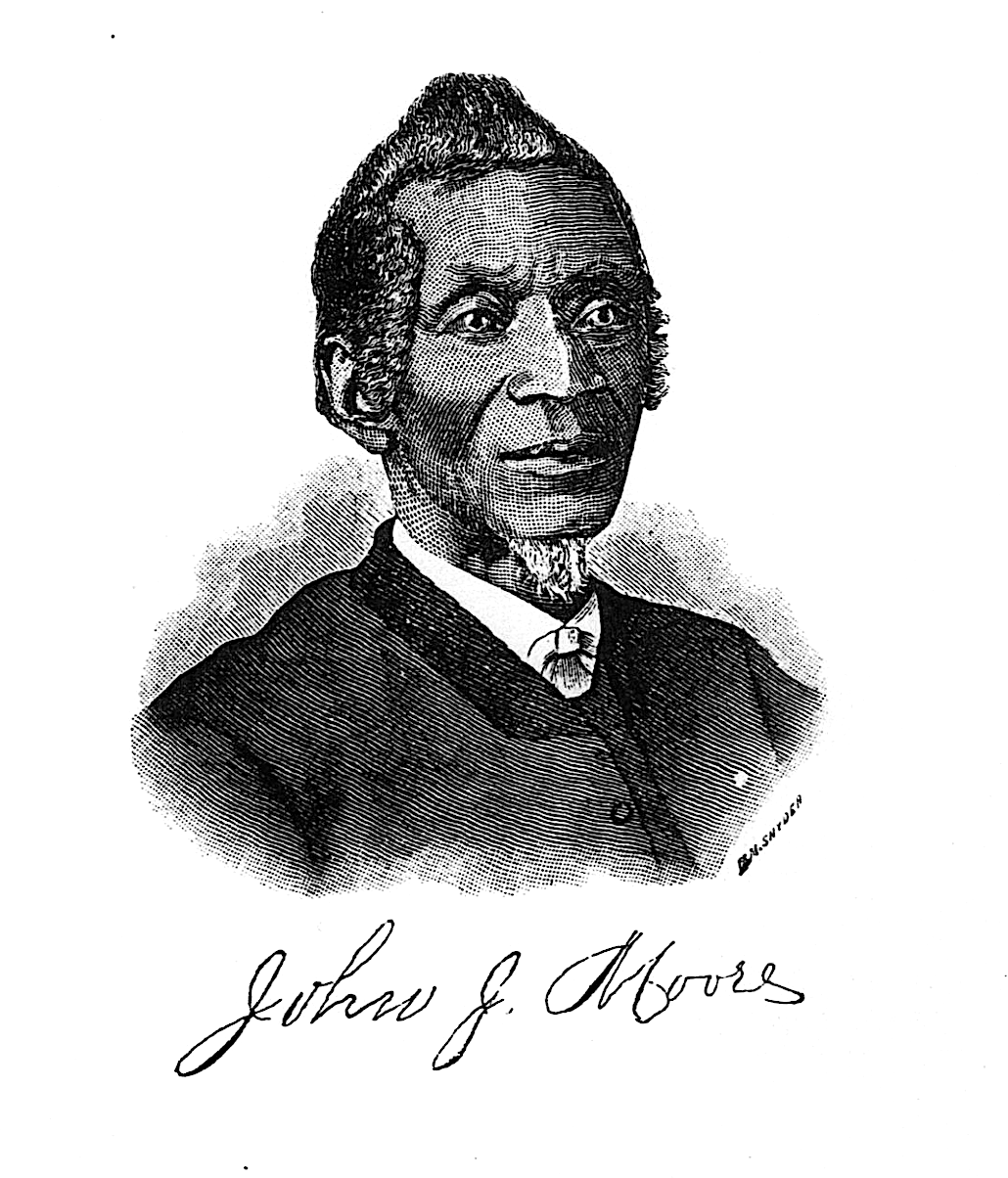
John Jamison Moore, founder

The First African Methodist Episcopal Zion Church was founded in 1852 in San Francisco, California, U.S. It is one of the earliest African American churches in the west. It was formerly known as the Starr King Methodist Church (1855–1864), Stockton Street AME Zion Church (1864–1870); and is also known as First AMEZ Church and First AME Zion Church.

== History ==
This church is one of three Black churches founded in 1852 in San Francisco, the other two are the Third Baptist Church, and the Bethel African Methodist Episcopal Church.

The parent body church was founded in New York City in 1796, and officially formed in 1821. The First AME Zion Church of San Francisco was founded by Rev. John Jamison Moore. From 1852 until 1855, this congregation met in a make shift structure.

In 1864, the First AME Zion Church congregation purchased their first church building from the First Unitarian Church at what was 805 Stockton Street at Pacific Street, in the Chinatown neighborhood. The First Unitarian Church was led by abolitionist and clergyman Thomas Starr King. From 1855 until 1864, the congregation used the name Starr King Methodist Church, in reverence for Rev. Thomas Starr King. The congregation moved to Stockton Street, between Broadway Street and Vallejo Street in the North Beach neighborhood, and then used the name Stockton Street AME Zion Church. The church building was destroyed in the 1906 San Francisco earthquake and fire, which also destroyed most of their records. After the 1906 earthquake, the church moved to 1669 Geary Street, between Webster Street and Buckingham Way, in what is now the Fillmore District.

In 1960, the church moved to 2159 Golden Gate Avenue in the NoPa neighborhood of San Francisco, under the leadership of Rev. L. Roy Bennett.

== Pastors ==
- Rev. John Jamison Moore (1852–1858)
- Rev. Adam B. Smith (1858–1862)
- Rev. J. C. Lodge
- Rev. William H. Hillary (1878–)
- Rev. Alexander Walters (1883–1886)
- Rev. Charles Calvin Pettey (1887–1887)
- Rev. J. H. Hector (1887–1888)
- Rev. W. J. Byers (1909–)
- Rev. George Haines (1911–1912)
- Rev. W. W. Matthews (1912–)
- Rev. E. Jones
- Rev. E. M. Clark (c. 1917–)
- Rev. E. M. Lightfoot
- Rev. Byers (1918–1926)
- Rev. E. J. Magruder (1926–1941)
- Rev. H. B. Gantt (1941–1946)
- Rev. Harold Clement (1946–1956)
- Rev. L. Roy Bennett (1956–1965)
- Rev. B. Leon Carson (1965–1973)
- Rev. Parree Porter Sr. (1973–1980)
- Rev. Percy King Smith Jr. (1980–1987)
- Rev. John E. Watts (1987–1995)
- Rev. Keith I. Harris (1995–1998)
- Rev. James A. McMillian (1998–2000)
- Rev. George C. Woodruff (2001–2009)
- Rev. Malcolm Byrd (2009–present)

== See also ==
- African Americans in California
- African Americans in San Francisco
- Colored Conventions Movement
