= The Lunar Visitor =

The Lunar Visitor, San Francisco's first black magazine, was first published in 1852 (174 years ago) in San Francisco, California by John Jamison (JJ) Moore, a formerly enslaved preacher affiliated with the African Methodist Episcopal (AME) Church. The magazine featured poetry, literary reviews, and news of the national abolitionist movement.

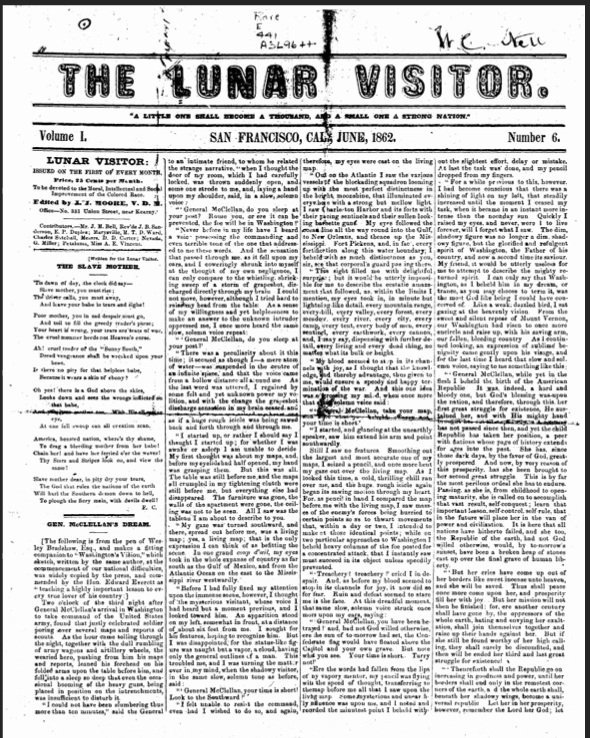
The Lunar Visitor, June 1862, Volume 1, Number 6.

The magazine was published during the same period as The Pacific Appeal, which described Moore's publication in its early issues as part of the ecosystem of San Francisco's emerging Black press that served as focal points for communication, political advocacy, and cultural life within emerging Black settlements in the West. In referencing The Lunar Visitor, the paper wrote that there was “sufficient room for us both to occupy successfully,” describing Moore as “better calculated than ourselves to conduct a publication of that kind".

African American women played a significant role in sustaining the publication through direct financial contributions and by organizing concerts at Bethel AME Church, hosting lectures, and holding benefit dinners to raise funds.

Writers focused on contemporary national discourse. For example, in a February 1862 issue, one writer reviewed the causes of the Civil War noting that slavery was the primary cause and Southern rebellion, or as written, "Jefferson Davis and his coadjutors" as the secondary cause of the war.
