= East Bakersfield, California =

- Unincorporated community Census designated place
- Location within California
- Coordinates: 35°22′59.47″N 118°58′27.73″W
- Country: United States
- State: California
- County: Kern
- County Subdivision: Bakersfield CCD

Area
  - Total: 0.787 sq mi (2.04 km^{2})
  - Land: 0.787 sq mi (2.04 km^{2})
  - Water: 0 sq mi (0 km^{2})
- Elevation: 482 ft (147 m)

Population (2020)
  - Total: 9,749
  - Density: 12,400/sq mi (4,780/km^{2})
- Time zone: UTC-8 (PST)
  - Summer (DST): UTC-7 (PDT)
- GNIS feature ID: 2804114

East Bakersfield is an unincorporated community and census-designated place (CDP) in Kern County, California, United States. As of the 2020 census, East Bakersfield had a population of 9,749.

== Demographics ==
Historical population
Census	Pop.	Note	%±
2020	9,749		—
U.S. Decennial Census; 1860–1870 1880-1890; 1900 1910 1920; 1930 1940 1950; 1960 1970 1980; 1990 2000 2010; 2020

East Bakersfield was first listed as a census designated place in the 2020 census.

=== 2020 census ===
As of the 2020 census, East Bakersfield had a population of 9,749. The median age was 27.8 years. 34.3% of residents were under the age of 18 and 7.1% of residents were 65 years of age or older. For every 100 females there were 100.8 males, and for every 100 females age 18 and over there were 98.7 males age 18 and over.

100.0% of residents lived in urban areas, while 0.0% lived in rural areas.

There were 2,764 households in East Bakersfield, of which 50.7% had children under the age of 18 living in them. Of all households, 32.6% were married-couple households, 22.1% were households with a male householder and no spouse or partner present, and 31.7% were households with a female householder and no spouse or partner present. About 17.3% of all households were made up of individuals and 4.3% had someone living alone who was 65 years of age or older.

There were 2,915 housing units, of which 5.2% were vacant. The homeowner vacancy rate was 1.3% and the rental vacancy rate was 3.3%.

East Bakersfield CDP, California – Racial and ethnic composition Note: the US Census treats Hispanic/Latino as an ethnic category. This table excludes Latinos from the racial categories and assigns them to a separate category. Hispanics/Latinos may be of any race.
Race / Ethnicity (NH = Non-Hispanic)	Pop 2020	% 2020
White alone (NH)	701	7.19%
Black or African American alone (NH)	508	5.21%
Native American or Alaska Native alone (NH)	43	0.44%
Asian alone (NH)	45	0.46%
Native Hawaiian or Pacific Islander alone (NH)	0	0.00%
Other race alone (NH)	16	0.16%
Mixed race or Multiracial (NH)	137	1.41%
Hispanic or Latino (any race)	8,299	85.13%
Total	9,749	100.00%
