= John Jamison Moore =

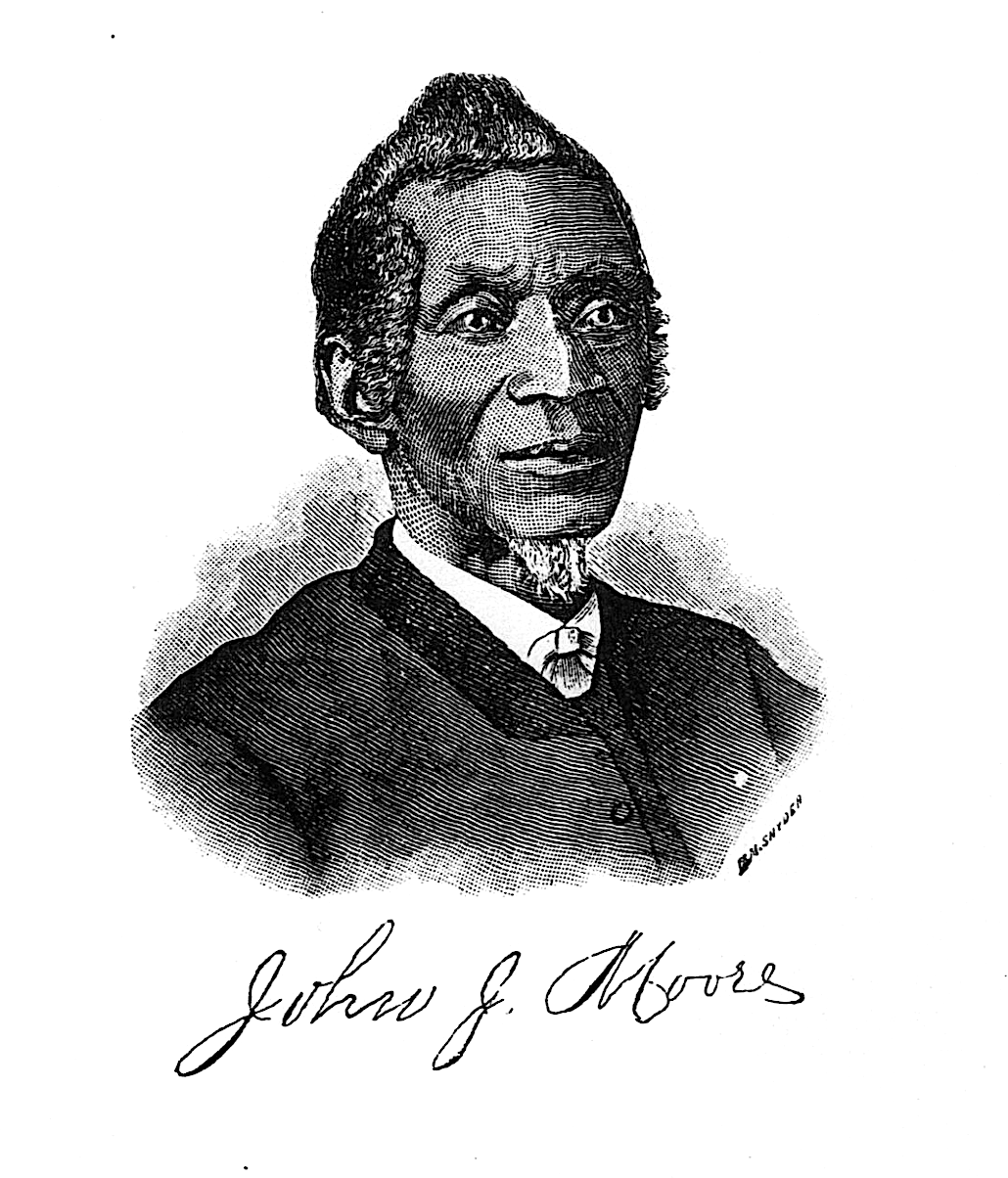
Image of John Jamison Moore, from his book, The History of the AME Zion Church in America, Founded in 1796, in the City of New York.

John Jamison Moore (1818 – December 9, 1893), also known as J. J. Moore, was an American bishop of the AME Zion Church, journalist, church historian, and educator. Moore's achievements include writing a history of the AME Zion Church, establishing the First AME Zion Church and the first Black school in San Francisco, and advocating for African-American access to education and religion through his newspaper, The Lunar Visitor.

== Early life ==
Moore was born enslaved in 1818, in what is today West Virginia. At age 15, he and his mother escaped to Philadelphia to live in freedom. Moore soon became involved in the African American Churches in that city. He eventually became a prominent preacher at the AME Zion Church in Philadelphia.

Moore also traveled to New York City to participate in activities at the AME Zion Church there. He wrote about this church in his book, The History of The AME Zion Church in America. Founded in 1796 in the City of New York.

== Life in San Francisco ==
In 1852, Moore moved to San Francisco to further the church in that city. According to Bishop B.J. Walls, Moore was credited with,

"Planting the core tenets of freedom, as practiced by his denomination, on the Pacific Coast, in 1852".

In August 1852, Moore founded the first AME Zion Church in San Francisco, initially located in a make shift space.

In May 1854, under the leadership of Rev. Thomas Marcus Decatur Ward of St. Cyprian AME Church at Jackson and Virginia Streets in San Francisco, Moore founded the first private school for African-American children who could not attend local public school, called the San Francisco Colored School. The school classes were held in the church basement, Moore served as the first teacher and principal. He created the school because African-American children were barred from the public schools in San Francisco. The first year, 23 students attended the school. In 1872, the California Supreme Court ruled Ward v. Floor current segregation in educational practices as unconstitutional, breaching U.S. Constitution's Fourteenth and Fifteenth amendments.

In 1862, Moore founded and became head editor of The Lunar Visitor newspaper. According to the First AME Zion Church's website, the Lunar Visitor newspaper, "promoted civil rights and advocated developing institutions for educational, social and political skills useful in working toward a full participation in American Society,". The newspaper was also "The only African-American magazine in the western part of the country," during the period it was being printed, according to Thomas Segady.

In spring of 1868, Rev. Moore left California, and was consecrated a Bishop in the denomination.

== Later life ==
Moore later moved to Salisbury, North Carolina, where he married Francis Moore. He died on December 9, 1893, on the train home from a conference in Western North Carolina. He was buried in Salisbury.

== See also ==
- African Americans in San Francisco
