= Bertha L. Turner =

American caterer, cookbook author, and community leader

Bertha Lee Turner
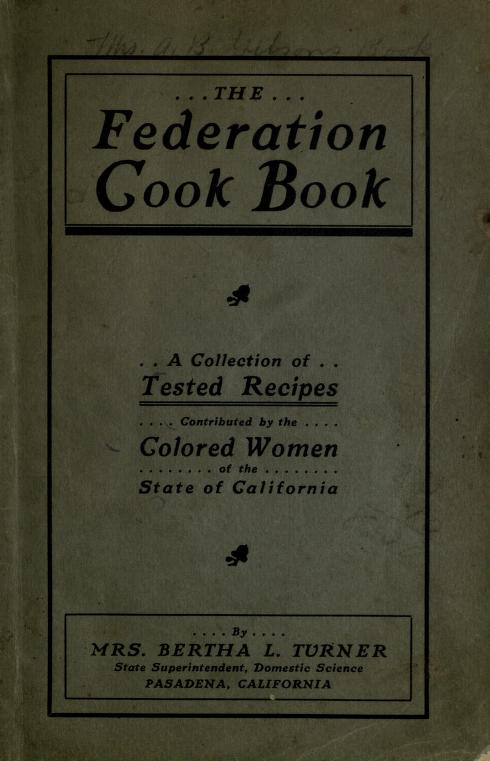
- Cover of Turner's 1910 cookbook
- Born: Bettie Lee; 1867; Kentucky, U.S.
- Died: February 4, 1938 (aged 70–71)
- Resting place: Mountain View Cemetery and Mausoleum, Altadena, California, U.S.
- Occupations: Caterer, cookbook author, community leader
- Spouse: James Turner
- Children: 1

Bertha Lee Turner (1867–1938) was an American caterer, cookbook author, and community leader in Pasadena, California, in the early 1900s. She is most famous for compiling The Federation Cookbook: A Collection of Tested Recipes Compiled by the Colored Women of the State of California.

== Early life ==
Bertha Lee Turner was born Bettie Lee, in 1867, in Kentucky. Turner was one of four children born to Squire (Henry) Lee and Sophia Mitchell. Her siblings' names were Benjamin, Sally, and Leander. Turner's father, Squire, was a veteran of the American Civil War. He enlisted in the Union Army in Lexington, Kentucky, and according to the U.S. Descriptive List of Colored Volunteer Army Soldiers, 1864, was enslaved when he enlisted. After the end of the war, by 1870, Squire was working as a farm hand while Sophia ran the home in Kentucky.

By 1880, when Turner was 13, she had moved to Marion, Indiana. Her mother, doing laundry to support the family, married her second husband, Edward Dupree, also a veteran of the Civil War.

Bertha married James Turner on December 6, 1891, when she was 24 years old. By 1895, they had their one and only son, Raymond. By 1900, Raymond was living with his grandparents, while Bertha and James worked in the home of a man named Sterling R. Scott, an ice manufacturer. Bertha was a servant while James was the butler.

Between 1900 and 1906, Turner and James moved to Pasadena, California.

== Career ==
In Pasadena, Turner became very involved in business and community affairs. Turner established a catering business in Pasadena, and joined the National Federation of Colored Women as well as the Sojourner Truth societies. She employed many residents of Pasadena, and provided scholarships for promising students. She was a member and trustee of The African Methodist Episcopal Church.

In 1910, Turner collected recipes and edited The Federation Cookbook: A Collection of Tested Recipes Compiled by the Colored Women of the State of California, a cookbook to preserve black culinary identity and celebrate the culinary success of local housewives. The cookbook assembled recipes from cooks living in and around Pasadena, most probably from the National Federation of Colored Women. The cookbook opens with a poem to modern housewives answering the perennial question of "what's for dinner" and also states that Turner was a State Superintendent of Domestic Science and private caterer.

She was known as a skilled cook and hostess, as evidenced by newspaper coverage of a dinner she held in October 1917:

"Mrs. Bertha Turner of 920 Worcester St., Pasadena, was a charming hostess on Monday evening when she gave a delightful dinner in honor of Mesdames L. Robinson, E. Lewis and Misses B. King and L. Thompson, all of New York. The Table was a dream of perfect beauty and the dainty table appointments of silver candelabras and silver baskets filled with choice pink nodding rose buds and large bows of delicate pink ribbon was a sight too beautiful to have been true, the transformation being so effective that those present thought of only fairy land where the fairies flitted here and there and the five course dinner was enjoyed to each heart's content and was only that will linger long in the memory of those bid to sup with such charming visitors as these ladies from New York. Besides the hostess and her husband the following were the dinner guests: Mr. and Mrs. Wm. Corbin, Mr. and Mrs. Chas. D. Conner, Mesdames Nolie Murray, Maude Stallings and Miss Estelle Everette."

Around 1917, Turner began to cater for various clubs in Pasadena, including Club No. 2 and the Shakespeare Club, a charitable organization. She contributed to the Shakespeare Club's 1936 cookbook, Dainties that are Bred in a Book. Turner was a patroness to the arts, sponsoring many events, including a 1915 play about Anthony Burns.

In 1924, Turner and her husband moved from 920 Worcester Avenue to a "palatial residence of 10 rooms, consisting of every modern convenience" at 725 Winona Avenue. In 1925, when Turner's daughter-in-law, Elsie Dalton Turner, was involved in a car accident that resulted in the death of a young girl, Turner wrote a Letter to the editor of the California Eagle noting the biased reporting.

From 1931 to 1934, Turner ran concessions of the Tea Garden at the Hollywood Bowl.

== Death ==
In 1937, Turner suffered a sudden health collapse. It was eventually diagnosed as bladder cancer, according to her death certificate. Turner died on February 4, 1938. Her death was a shock to the Pasadena community, who reported solely on her death as the social news of the week in the California Eagle.

There are no words to employ that might measure the extent of the loss that California sustains now and forever after: for hers was a niche that she alone could fill.

— George Garner, California Eagle

Turner's funeral was held at the African Methodist Episcopal Church in Pasadena, with an estimated 1500 people in attendance. Turner is buried at Mountain View Cemetery and Mausoleum in Altadena, Los Angeles County. At the time of her death she was reported to be "California's wealthiest colored citizen" and to have employed hundreds of people during the summer season.
