= African Americans in San Francisco =

Ethnic group in San Francisco

African Americans in San Francisco, California, composed just under 6% of the city's total population as of 2019 U.S. Census Bureau estimates, down from 13.4% in 1970. There are about 55,000 people of full or partial black ancestry living within the city. The community began with workers and entrepreneurs of the California Gold Rush in the 19th century, and in the early to mid-20th century, grew to include migrant workers with origins in the Southern United States, who worked as railroad workers or service people at shipyards. In the mid-20th century, the African American community in the Fillmore District earned the neighborhood the nickname the "Harlem of the West," referring to New York City's Harlem neighborhood, which is associated with African American culture.

Among the United States' biggest 14 cities, San Francisco is near the bottom in the percentage of Black residents, along with San Jose, which is about four percent Black.

The Black population of San Francisco has a large presence in Bayview-Hunters Point, SoMa, Fillmore District, and Visitacion Valley; and a decreased presence in Oceanview, and Potrero Hill.

== History ==
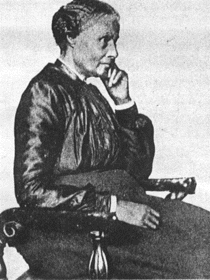
Businesswoman and abolitionist Mary Ellen Pleasant arrived in San Francisco during the Gold Rush

=== Early California to the 19th-century ===
People of African descent first appeared in California from Mexico due to the Spanish Conquest. Influential people of African ancestry were among the earliest California settlers and landowners.

Juana Briones de Miranda was a Californio business woman of mixed race with African ancestry. She is considered the "Founding Mother of San Francisco", as an early settler of Yerba Buena (now San Francisco). William Alexander Leidesdorff, helped establish the city of San Francisco.

During the 1849–1855 California Gold Rush, African Americans came to the San Francisco-area along with others from all over the world. Some came as enslaved people and worked the gold mines, others came as free entrepreneurs seeking to create a better life. Slavery was forbidden in California, when it entered the Union as a free state in 1850, but Black residents still faced discriminatory laws in education and employment and did not have the right to vote or testify against whites. In response, they created political organizations like the SF. Executive Committee and the Franchise League. Until the Fugitive Slave Act expired in 1855, they also risked being captured and sold into slavery unless they could prove they had lived in the state since before 1849.

The third of three statewide Colored Conventions was held in San Francisco in 1857, which resulted in the creation of California's first Black newspaper, the Mirror of the Times. Other post Gold Rush black newspapers included the Pacific Appeal and the Elevator, edited by Phillip Alexander Bell. By 1860, there were 1,176 African-Americans living in San Francisco, or 2% of the city's population, most of them middle class. The San Francisco Athenaeum and Literary Society, established in 1853, which included a saloon and an 800 book library, was a gathering place for African-Americans at that time.

The new community established the first black Baptist church west of the Rockies in 1852, originally called the First Colored Baptist Church of San Francisco, and now known as the Third Baptist Church, a city-designated landmark on McAllister Street. Other African American churches founded in 1852 in San Francisco included Bethel African Methodist Episcopal Church (Bethel AME Church), and First African Methodist Episcopal Zion Church (First AME Zion Church).

Despite discrimination in employment, by 1862, African-Americans in San Francisco owned $300,000 in assets, mostly real estate. $100,000 of this was owned by two people: Mary Ellen Pleasant ($30,000) and a partner of hers, Richard Barber ($70,000). George Washington Dennis was the city's wealthiest African American man; he was a former slave, turned entrepreneur, real estate developer, and advocate for Black rights.

By the 1870s, the Gold Rush boom was over; 60% of African-American men and 97% of women were working in the service industry, as waiters, draymen, porters, maids, ship cooks, stewards. The rise of discriminatory white labor unions in the late 19th century, compounded by increased immigration from Europe and Asia, made it harder for black residents to find jobs. In 1885, the Palace Hotel replaced their entire black staff with white union workers.

=== 20th century ===
From 1921 until 1972, the Madame C.J. Walker Home for Girls and Women was in operation in Upper Fillmore (Lower Pacific Heights), a charitable, community and social services organization for single African American woman new to San Francisco, who were not eligible to use the YWCA.

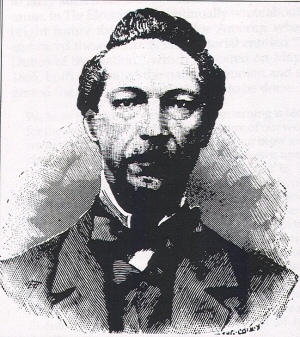
19th Century newspaper editor Phillip Alexander Bell

Around the 1920s during the end of the Barbary Coast-era, Terrific Street was an entertainment district in San Francisco and it was home to numerous black and tan clubs (interracial clubs that highlighted African American culture), where Black musicians and entrepreneurs contributed to San Francisco's rollicking nightlife scene. Former-Pullman Porters, Lew Purccell and Sam King owned the black and tan "So Different Club" and "Purcell's", where pianist Sid Pirotti played in a ragtime ensemble. Jelly Roll Morton opened the Jupiter club on Columbus Avenue in 1917, also a black and tan club.

During the Second Great Migration of the 20th century, the San Francisco Bay Area was a destination for African Americans coming out of the South. The city's Black population rose considerably during World War II, when the War Manpower Commission recruited African Americans from the South to work the recently acquired Naval Docks in Hunters Point of San Francisco. Word soon spread that African Americans could find work in San Francisco, with many of them moving to the newly constructed war housing in Hunter's Point.

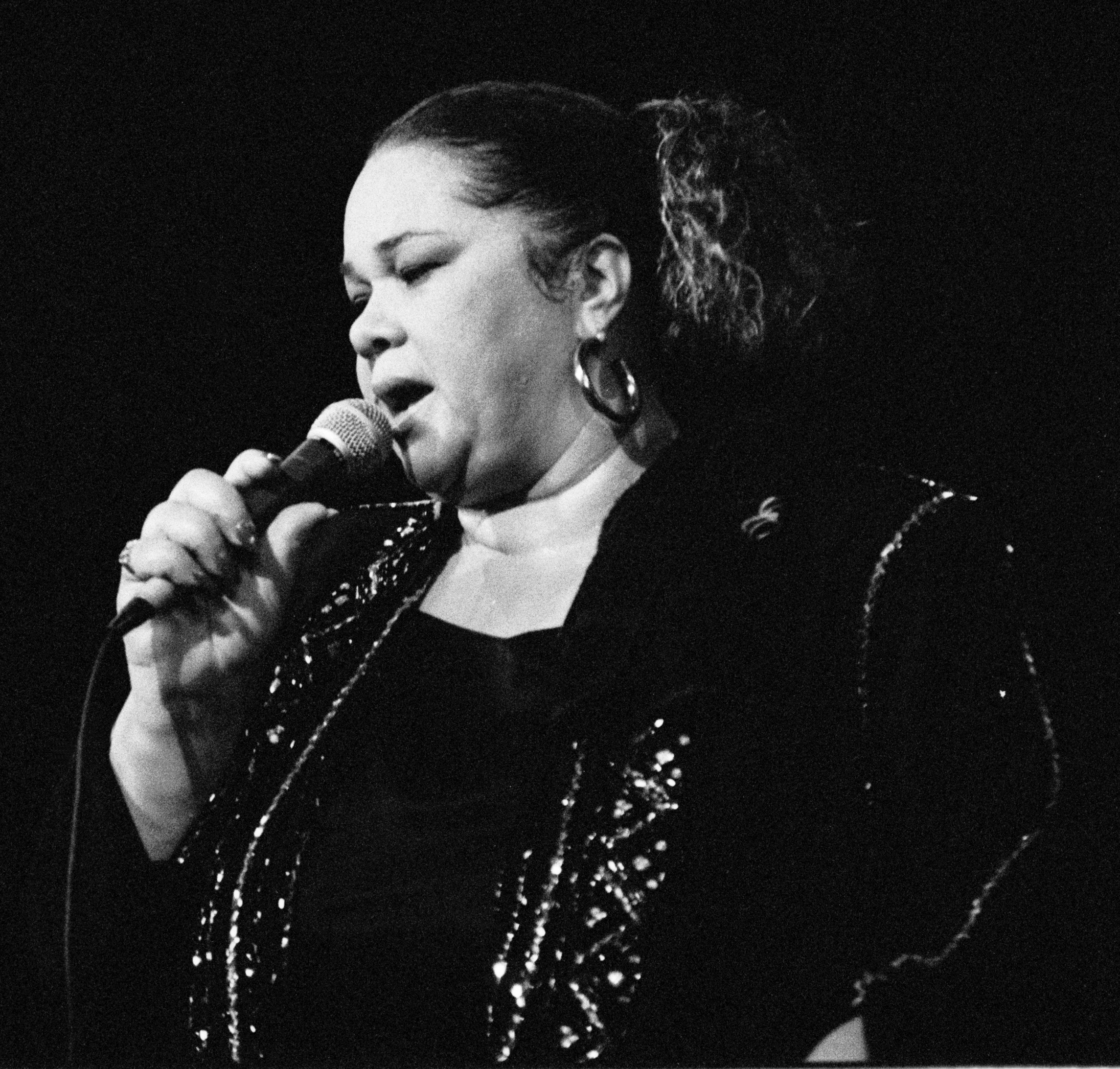
Etta James started her musical career in the 1950s as a teenager in the Fillmore District

By the end of World War II, the center for Black life, music and entertainment had moved to the Fillmore District, earning it the title of "Harlem of the West." A small, but existent community of African Americans were present in the Fillmore District after the 1906 San Francisco earthquake, but it wasn't until World War II when the Fillmore District and San Francisco as a whole began to have a large African-American population. Between the years of 1940 and 1950 the African American population of San Francisco grew from 4,836 to 43,460. going from 0.5% to 4.5% of the city's total population. A vast majority of these African Americans went on to occupy the Fillmore District. This large migration of African Americans was due to three major factors. The first was that the Japanese internment in 1942 left a large number of unoccupied homes and businesses within the Fillmore. The second was that the shipbuilding industry and wartime economy created by WWII brought a large number of wartime jobs into the city. The third was that many African Americans left the south in the Great Migration in order to escape the Jim Crow laws which existed there.

After the war, the African American population contributed significantly to the growing jazz culture in the Fillmore, with clubs, such as Jimbo's Bop City and the New Orleans Swing Club (ca 1950–1965), flourishing there. Billie Holiday, Dizzy Gillespie, Miles Davis, Kenny Dorham, and Dexter Gordon were entertainers who performed in the Fillmore during its heyday. In addition, the trend of African American migration to the city and the district continued at a fast pace until it reached a peak of about 13 percent in the 1970s.

The Church for the Fellowship of All Peoples was opened in 1948 by Howard Thurman, becoming the first racially integrated interfaith church in the United States.

The influx of African Americans during and after WWII created a large amount of racial tensions. Many African Americans were forced to live in certain neighborhoods of the city and were denied employment by various businesses. San Francisco's housing discrimination against its Black residents received media attention when San Francisco Giants' baseball legend Willie Mays' attempt to buy a home in St. Francis Wood in 1957 was refused because of his race. In the early 1960s, blacks and whites demonstrated against discriminatory hiring practices at San Francisco's department stores, hotels, drive-ins, grocery stores, banks and car dealerships. The Civil Rights Movement succeeded in making significant legal gains for African Americans and many other ethnic groups. However, there are still significant social tensions which exist today.

From its high point in the 1970s, San Francisco's Black population has dwindled for a variety of reasons, including the city's high cost of living, urban renewal which tore down black neighborhoods, gentrification, redlining, and Black exodus from high crime areas to the suburbs.

== Social issues and relationship with police ==
The city's African American community has had a mixed-opinion relationship with the San Francisco Police Department and law enforcement in the Bay Area. Instances of race riots, police brutality and mass incarceration have been a concern for many African-American leaders, pastors, and civilians. In 2013, a San Francisco Chronicle article's statistics showed that 56% of the San Francisco County Jail's inmates are Black, which is 9-10 times higher than the city's African American residence percentage, which was 6-7% during this time period. Those who were considered to be in need of specialized mental health help, rose from 56% in 2008, to 71% in 2013, which accounted for inmates of all races. People who were Black and Hispanic American made up a higher proportion of officer-involved fatalities in the Bay Area, which African Americans making up 27% of the 110 deaths from January 2015 to July 2018. This is roughly four times higher than the Bay Area's 7-8% Black community.

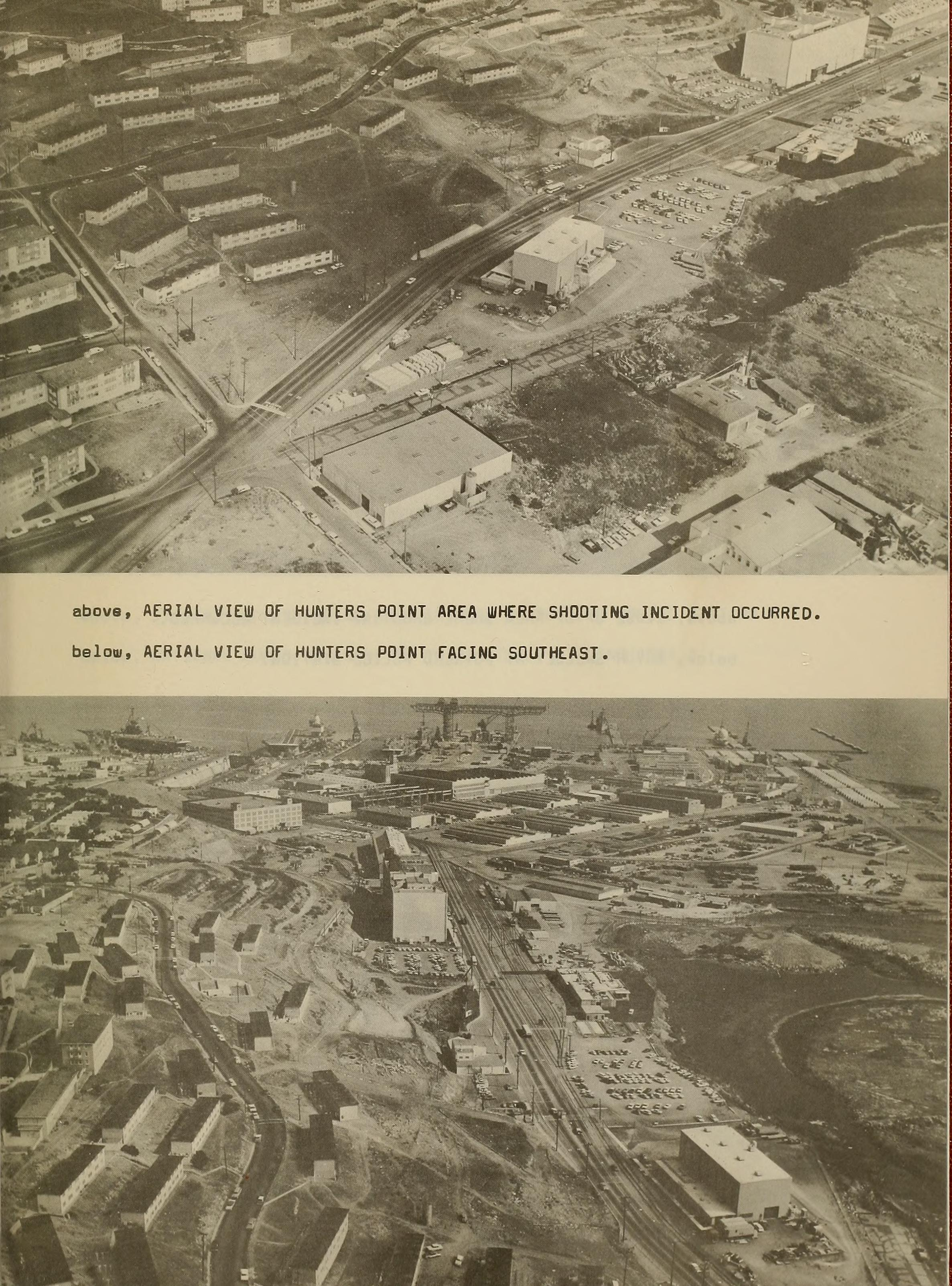
Aerial View of Hunter's Point, 1966

On September 27, 1966, a riot broke out in the proximity of the housing projects of Griffith and Oakdale Avenue in the Hunters Point neighborhood when Matthew Johnson, a 16-year-old Black boy suspected of stealing a car, was shot and killed by White SFPD officer Alvin Johnson. Three warning shots were fired towards the car Johnson was driving, and a fourth shot struck Matthew's back. The riots lasted for four days, and 359 arrests were made, and 51 people were injured as a result of the unrest. Riots occurred in the Bayview/Hunter's Point neighborhood, where Molotov cocktails and rocks were thrown at police and civilians, as well as the Fillmore District, and Mission High School. After reports of gunfire from the Bayview Community Center, police fired into the center, where several hundred adults and children had gathered, resulting in seven injuries. The National Guard and California Highway Patrol were deployed by Governor Pat Brown during the violence until October 1, when the riots became less destructive. On October 20, 1966, Alvin Johnson was declared by the San Francisco County District Attorney's office to have committed a justifiable homicide, and did not face charges as a result.

The Black Panthers started two months afterwards, in Oakland in 1966. They also had a presence in San Francisco, with an office in the Fillmore District and community programs throughout black neighborhoods of the city. They advocated open carry armed citizen patrols to protect against police brutality and put forth the idea of community policing based on San Francisco districts.

In 1968, the Officers for Justice association was formed, spearheaded by Black police officer Prentice Earl Sanders. In 1973 the group filed a class-action discrimination lawsuit in federal court against the San Francisco Police Department, the city, and County of San Francisco, and the Civil Service Commission for their failure to recruit and hire minorities. Sanders later became the city's first Black chief of police.

The Peoples Temple in San Francisco, founded by Jim Jones, was headquartered in San Francisco during the early to mid-1970s. The temple, which would later be involved in a mass suicide and murder in Guyana in 1977, recruited and appealed to many working-class African-Americans throughout the U.S.

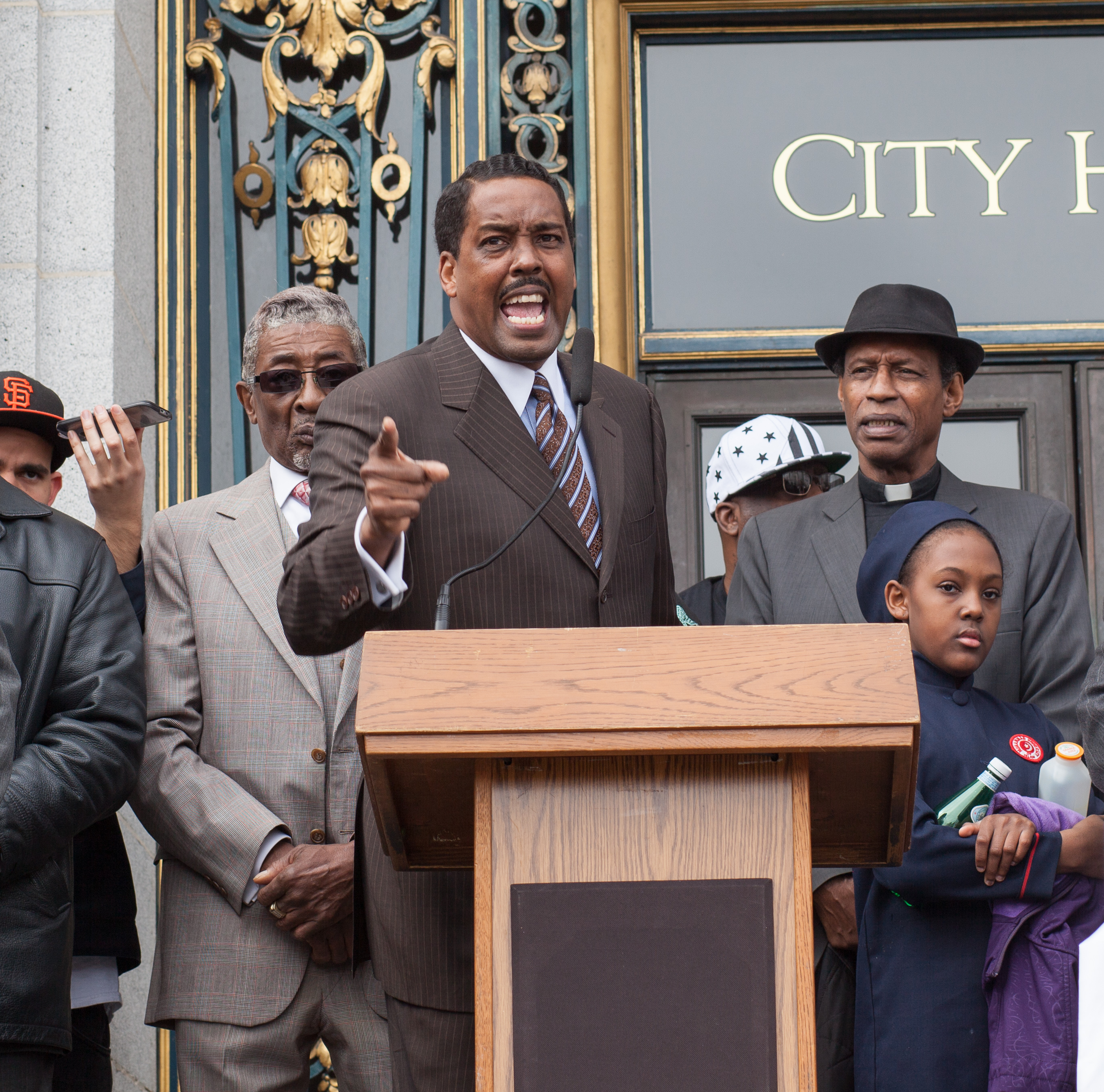
Christopher Muhammad at San Francisco March 2016 protest against police violence - 3

Also during the 1970s, a series of black-on-white murders labeled the Zebra Killings caused police to treat every black man in San Francisco as a suspect, issuing a "Z-card" to anyone who was "cleared" of being a suspect. The murders were eventually determined to have been committed by members of a splinter group of the Nation of Islam.

On December 2, 2015, five SFPD officers shot and killed 26-year-old African American Mario Woods on Keith Street in Bayview. Woods, a suspect in a stabbing and wounding of a man, was confronted by officers on a sidewalk and was armed with a kitchen knife. The shooting, recorded by at least two bystanders, showed Woods being shot with a beanbag gun four times in the chest and hips, and then slowly approaching an officer who stepped into Woods' path before Woods is fired upon. The shooting led to protests in the city. An autopsy indicated that Woods had 20 gunshot wounds, in the head, back, abdomen, buttocks, legs and hands, and was under the influence of meth and marijuana. Mario Woods Day was declared an unofficial holiday in the city on July 22, Woods' birthday.

On November 23, 2020, for the first time in San Francisco history, a police officer was charged with an on-duty killing. Chris Samayoa, who was on the force for four days at the time of the incident, shot and killed Keita O'Neal, 42, an assault and car theft suspect, in Bayview-Hunters Point, on December 1, 2017. O'Neal allegedly assaulted a female California State Lottery employee, and then stole a vehicle owned by the lottery company. Samayoa, who had ended his job with the department, was charged with manslaughter and assault by a police officer and with a semi-automatic firearm in connection with the case. O'Neal was allegedly unarmed during the incident, and was walking away from Samayoa. This is the second time in 2020 that a police officer in the San Francisco Bay Area was charged with an on-duty death; on April 18, 2020, San Leandro Police Officer Jason Fletcher Tasered 32-year-old African American Steven DeMarco Taylor twice in a San Leandro Walmart, and then shot him once in the chest while a backup officer had just arrived several seconds prior to the shot being fired. The incident was caught on body cameras; Taylor was suspected of stealing items in the store or causing a disturbance, and started swinging or handling a metal baseball bat. Taylor was still armed with the bat, but did not advance towards Fletcher as he was being Tasered and then shot. On September 2, 2020, Fletcher was charged with voluntary manslaughter and was arraigned on September 15.

== Crime in Black community ==
San Francisco and the general Bay Area's Black community has dealt with street and prison gangs, drug-related crime and other crimes over the decades.

The gang Westmob, associated with Oakdale Mob and Sunnydale housing project gangs from the southeast area of the city, was involved in a gang war with Hunters Point-based Big Block from 1999 to the 2000s. Its current status of activity is unknown. and is linked to rap and drugs. They claim territory from West Point to Middle Point in San Francisco's notoriously dangerous Hunters Point projects.

In 2004, Westmob member David Hill, then 21, fatally shot SFPD Officer Isaac Espinoza, 29, and wounded his partner with an AK-47, on a Bayview street. In 2007, he was found guilty of the crime and sentenced to life without parole.

In April 2009, two Westmob members were involved in a West Point Road shooting of a man they suspected was a snitch of a case involving Westmob members. The bullets missed the intended victim, and almost struck his 5-year-old brother. Two weeks later, the two gunmen shot the intended victim nine times in front of his home as he was cutting his younger brother's hair. He survived. In 2013, both gunmen, who were 23 and 25 during this year, were convicted of two counts of attempted murder, and were facing life sentences.

In January 2015, four young Black men (ages 19 to 22) were shot to death while sitting in a car at Laguna and Page Street in the area of Fillmore District/Hayes Valley. An arrest of a 27-year-old man was made in July 2016. The motive remains to be debated or undetermined, although the suspect was charged with gang enhancements. He had alleged ties with the Black Guerilla Family.

In 2019, although African Americans only made up 5% of San Francisco's population, 22% of aggravated assault victims, and 17% of sexual assault victims were Black.

== Politics ==
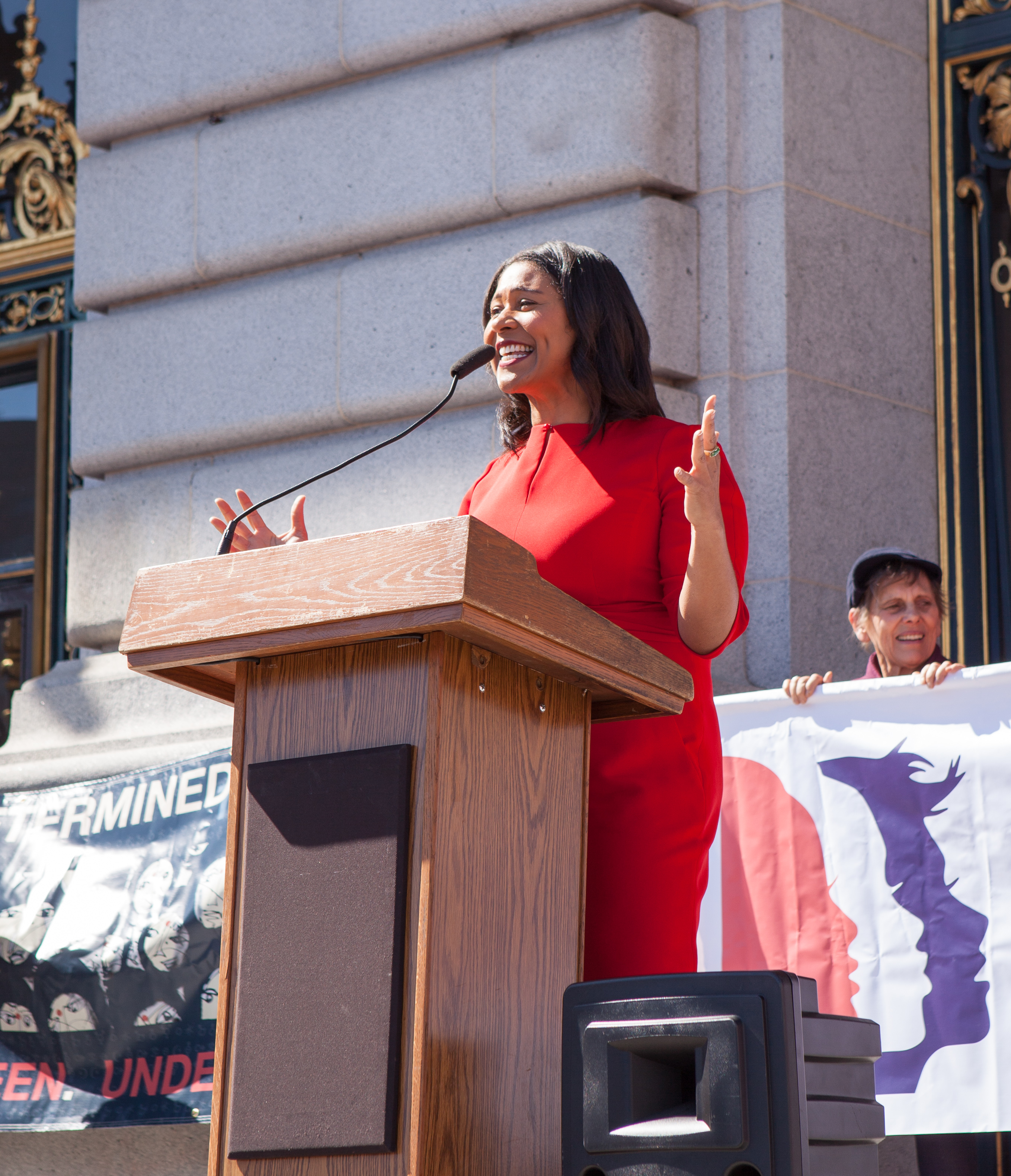
Mayor London Breed

Cecil F. Poole in 1961 became the first African American to serve as a United States Attorney. He was also the first African American to serve as a Judge of the Northern District of California and the second African American to serve as a Judge of the Ninth Circuit. Terry Francois became the first African American on San Francisco's Board of Supervisor's in 1964. The 41st Mayor of San Francisco, Willie Brown, a Texas native who came to San Francisco to attend San Francisco State University, served two terms from January 8, 1996, to January 8, 2004, being the first Black person to hold that office. After the death of Ed Lee, the city's first Asian American mayor, on December 12, 2017, San Francisco-born London Breed took his place as the city's acting mayor. She was officially sworn as an official mayor on July 11, 2018, being San Francisco's first female African-American mayor.

== Culture ==
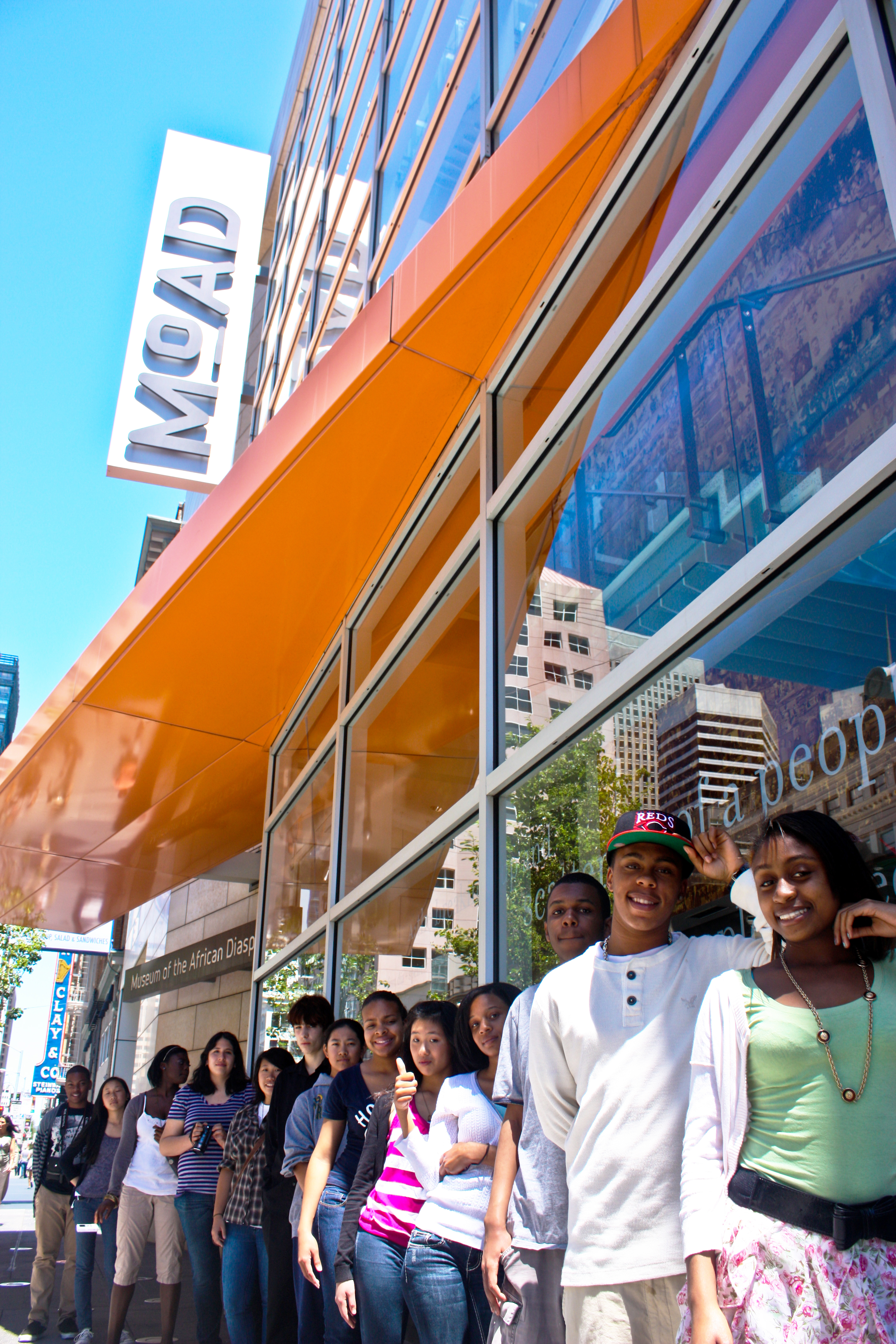
Museum of the African Diaspora Members Outside

Aside from their extensive contributions to San Francisco's musical history, African Americans have also added to the city's cultural life in literature, art, education, theater and media.

Marcus Books was founded in 1960 as one of the country's first Black bookstores and became the oldest African American bookstore in the United States. It closed its San Francisco location in 2014 but has an office in Oakland and plans to reopen again at the African American Art and Culture Complex.

From 1968 until 1979 the Bayviewer (Lennie's Bayviewer) magazine was published, a political and social magazine focused on the African American community in the San Francisco Bay Area. Bayviewer magazine collection can be found at Oakland Public Library in the African American Museum and Library at Oakland.

The first university Black studies department in the United States was created at San Francisco State University in 1968, following a student strike.

The St. John Coltrane African Orthodox Church, founded in 1971, continues to hold services in the Fillmore District.

The Lorraine Hansberry Theater, founded in 1981, produces classics of African American theater as well as new plays. Pomo Afro Homos was a theater group created in the 1990s to give voice to Black Gay Male voices.

Radio station KPOO, started in 1973, became the only black-controlled independent public radio station west of the Mississippi, and was the first to launch a show focusing on rap music in 1979. In the 1990s, the radio station KMEL was also influential in broadcasting the new sounds of San Francisco and Oakland Hip Hop artists.

The ongoing San Francisco Black Film Festival was created in 1998 to share the work of local as well as global filmmakers. Films of the 21st century that have focused on San Francisco's Black community include The Last Black Man in San Francisco, and Straight Outta Hunter's Point.

The Museum of the African Diaspora, which opened in 2005 at Yerba Buena Gardens, documents the history, art and culture of the African Diaspora.

The African American Art and Culture Complex on Fulton Street in the Fillmore District hosts workshops, art events and the city's Juneteenth Festival. Created in the 1970s, it is now home to ten separate black arts organizations, including the African American Historical and Cultural Society, founded in 1955, and the African-American Shakespeare Company, founded in 1994.

== Historical sites ==
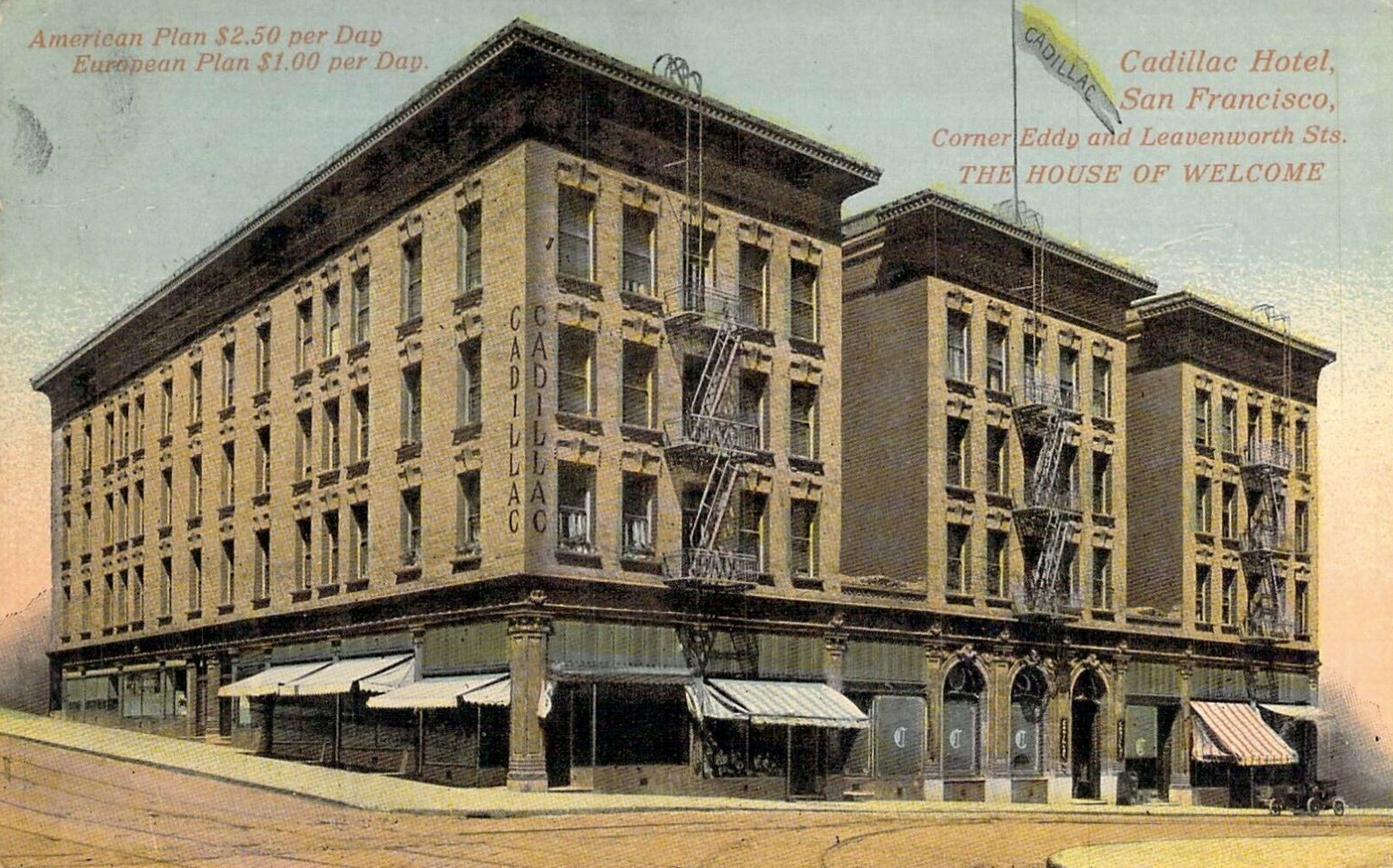
Cadillac Hotel (c. 1913), Tenderloin

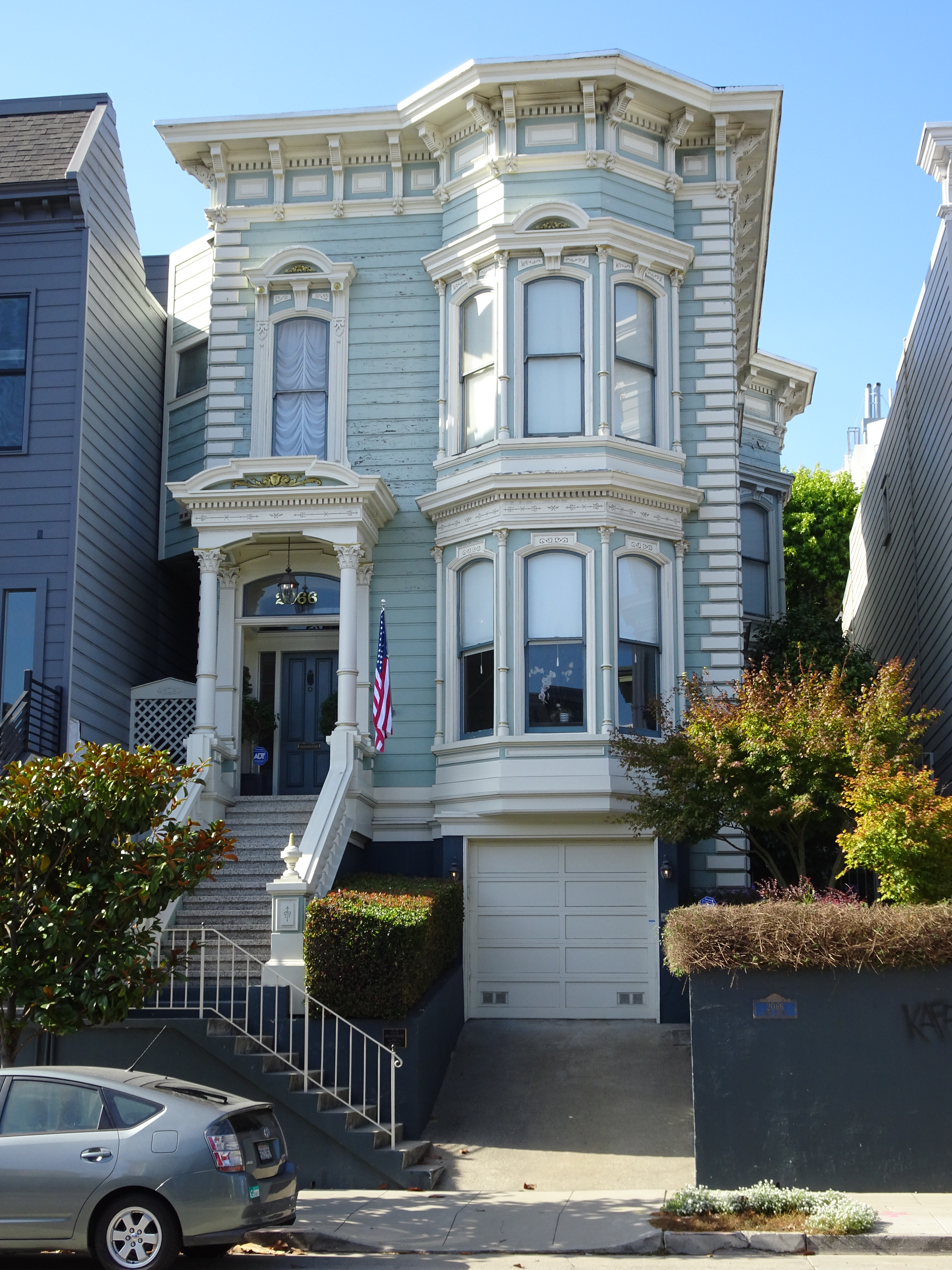
Madame C.J. Walker Home for Girls and Women, Upper Fillmore

- Bethel African Methodist Episcopal Church, 916 Laguna Street
- Cadillac Hotel, 366–394 Eddy Street; SFDL-listed
- California Savings and Land Association, 465 California Street
- Church for the Fellowship of All Peoples, 2041 Larkin Street; SFDL-listed
- First A.M.E. Zion Church, 2163 Golden Gate Avenue
- Frederick Douglass Plaza (1968), on Pierce Street between Oak and Fell Streets
- Cecil F. Poole House, 90 Cedro Street; SFDL-listed
- Leidesdorff Street, named for William Leidesdorff (1810–1848)
- Macedonia Missionary Baptist Church, 2135 Sutter Street; SFDL-listed
- Madame C.J. Walker Home for Girls and Women, 2066 Pine Street; SFDL-listed
- New Pullman Hotel, 236 Townsend Street; SFDL-listed
- Purcell's So Diff'rent Nightclub, 550 Pacific Street; former site
- Sam Jordan's Bar, 4004–4006 3rd Street; SFDL-listed; former site
- Tribute to Mary Ellen Pleasant, southwest corner of Bush and Octavia streets

== Notable people ==
=== Business ===
- Mary Ellen Pleasant (1815–1904), businesswoman and abolitionist
- George Washington Dennis (c. 1850–1916), 19th century businessman
- Mifflin Wistar Gibbs (1823–1915), 19th century businessperson, journalist, politician
- Peter Lester (c. 1814–c. 1897), 19th century businessperson, and abolitionist
- William T. Shorey (1859–1919), whaling captain who lived in Oakland and shipped out of San Francisco
- Charles Sullivan (1909–1966), music promoter in the mid-1950s and 1960s and the "Mayor of Fillmore"

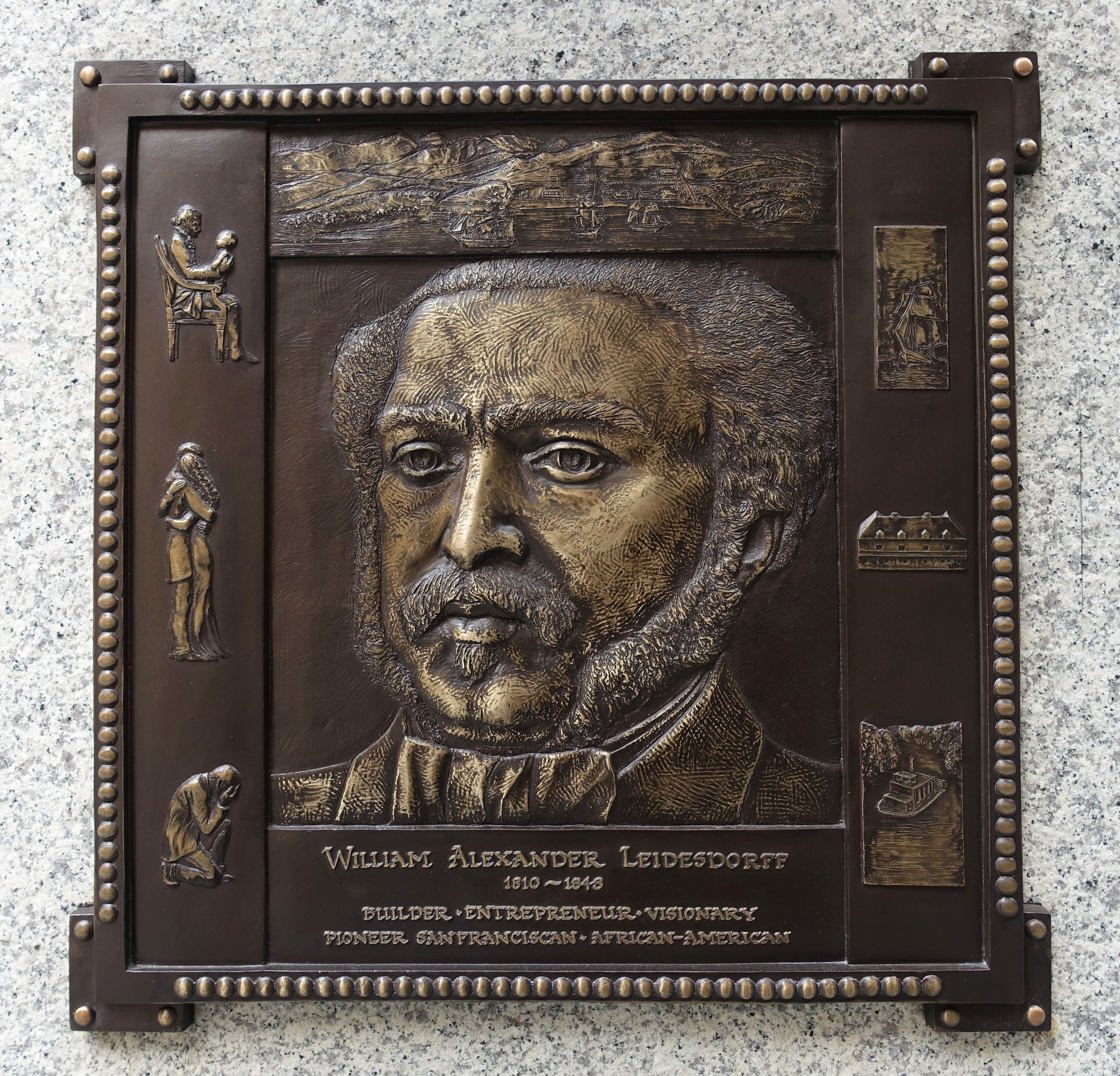
William Alexander Leidesdorff memorial in San Francisco, CA

=== Politics and law ===
- William Leidesdorff (1810–1848), 1845 businessman, president of the San Francisco School Board and also elected as City Treasurer.
- Howard Thurman (1899–1981), author, philosopher, theologian, mystic, educator, and civil rights leader
- Cecil F. Poole (1914–1997), first African American to serve as a United States Attorney (outside of the United States Virgin Islands), the first African American to serve as a Judge of the Northern District of California and the second African American to serve as a Judge of the Ninth Circuit.
- Terry Francois (c. 1922–1989) first African American member of the San Francisco Board of Supervisors, and a prominent African-American civil rights attorney in the 1960s.
- Ella Hill Hutch (1923–1981), city supervisor
- Willie Brown (politician) (born 1934), elected 41st Mayor of San Francisco and 1st African American Mayor in 1995. He was re-elected in 1999.
- Prentice Earl Sanders (1937–2021), first Black police chief and member of the San Francisco Police Department from 1964 through 2003.
- London Breed (born 1974) 45th mayor of San Francisco.

=== Activism ===
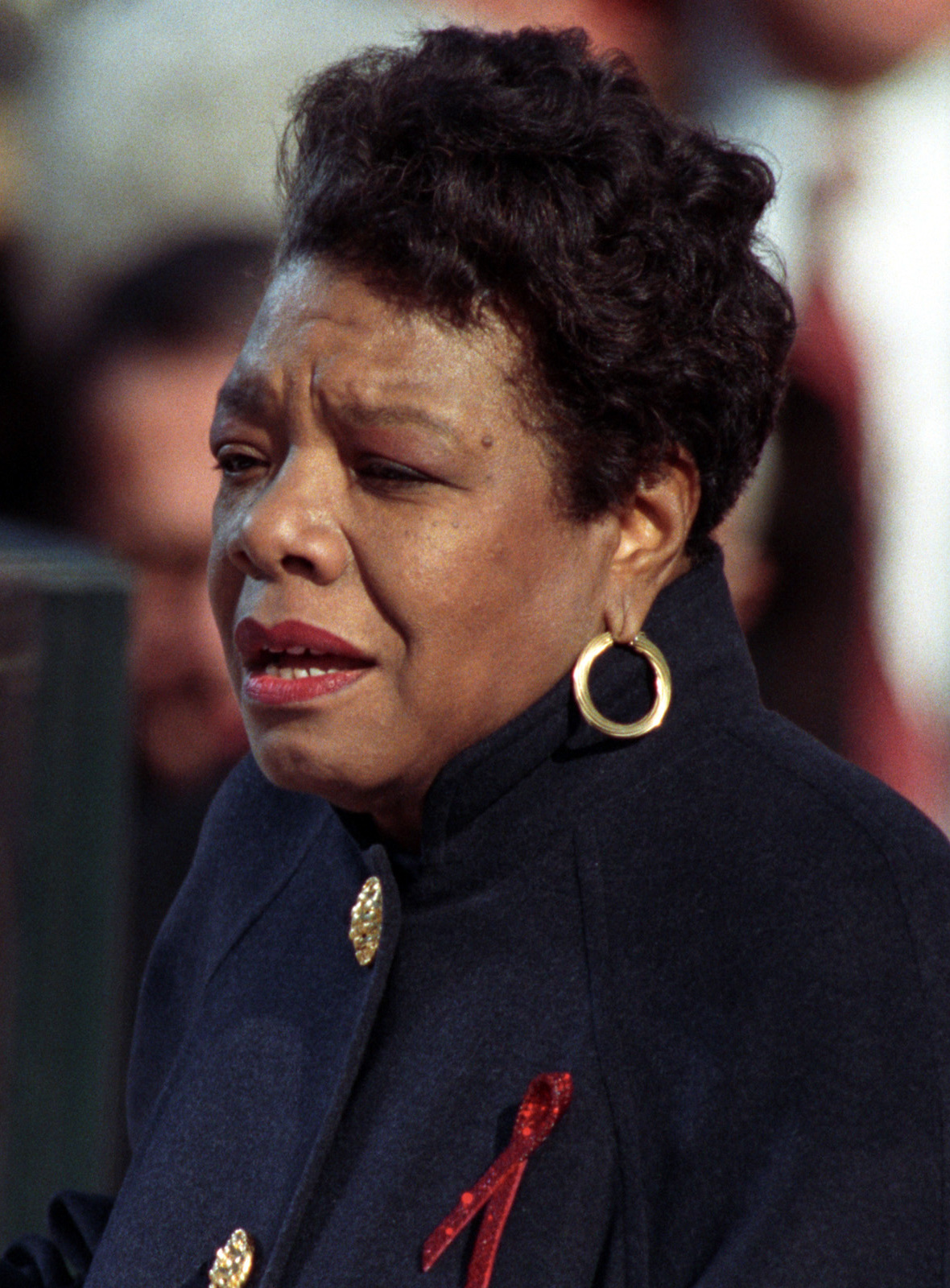
Poet and activist Maya Angelou was the first Black female cable car conductor in San Francisco

- Big Five of Bayview, environmental and community activists in the 1960s and 1970s
- Charlotte L. Brown (1839–1914), challenged 19th century streetcar segregation
- Elouise Westbrook (1915–2011), housing activist
- Sarah Webster Fabio (1928–1979), poet, educator and political activist
- Mary L. Booker (1931–2017), civil rights activist in the Bayview neighborhood
- Enola Maxwell (1919–2003), minister, civil rights activist, and community leader in Potrero Hill
- John Jamison Moore (1818–1893), First AME Zion founder and minister, founder of the first private black school in San Francisco
- Christopher Muhammad, Bay Area Minister of the Nation of Islam and political activist
- William L. Patterson (1891–1980), communist activist and active member of Civil Rights Congress
- Hettie B. Tilghman (1871–1933), born in San Francisco, an organizer and secretary for Bethel A.M.E. Church Sunday School
- Bob Slattery, African American activist and a leader for the Congress of Racial Equality (CORE)
- Cecil Williams (1929–2024), pastor at Glide Memorial Church

=== Film ===
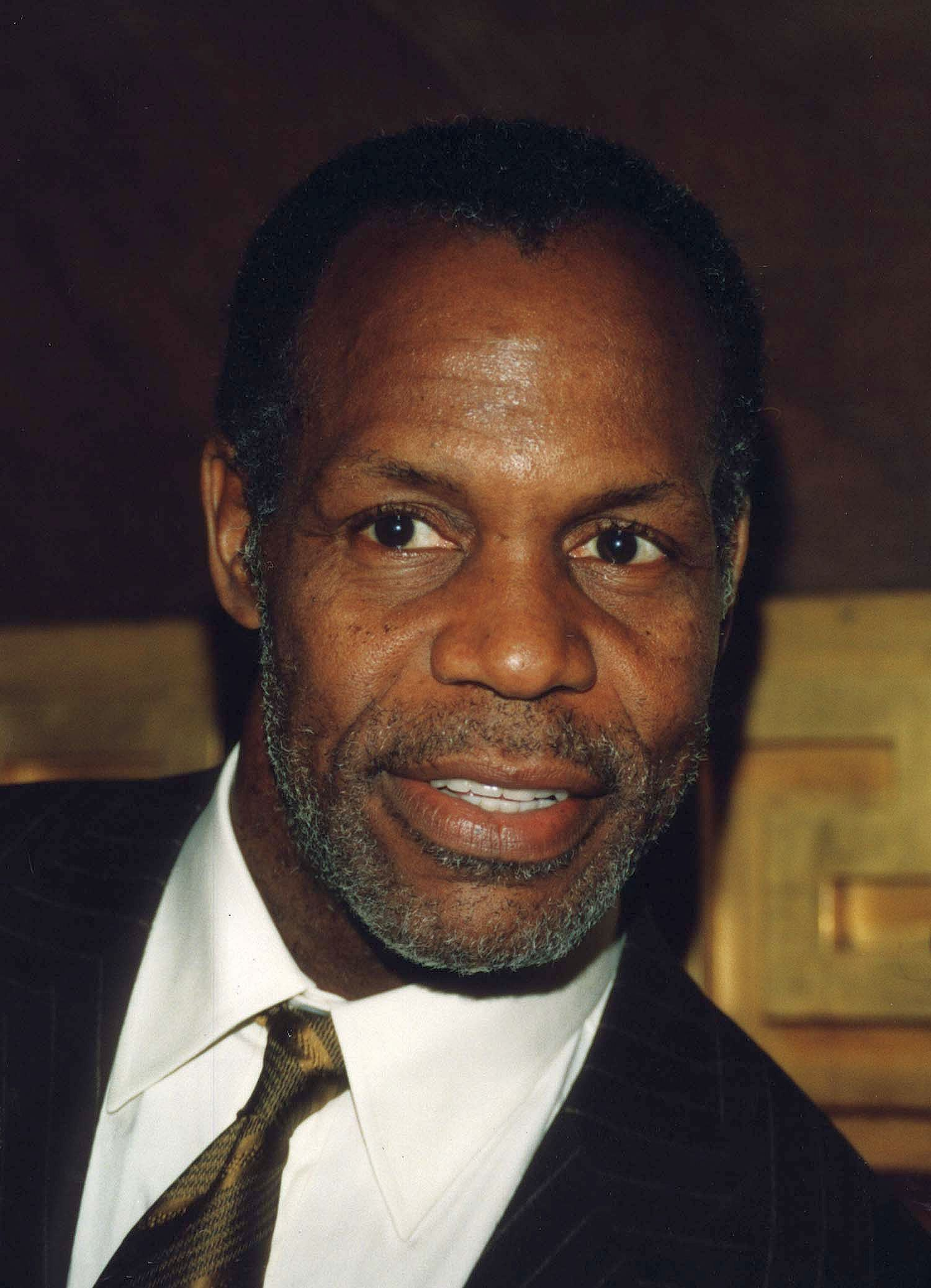
Danny Glover, actor and Native San Franciscan

- Jimmie Fails (1994), actor known for the semi-autobiographical film The Last Black Man in San Francisco.
- Danny Glover (born 1946), Hollywood actor, film director and political activist
- Terri J. Vaughn (born 1969), actress born and raised in Bayview–Hunters Point.
- Kevin Epps, filmmaker, best known for the documentary Straight Outta Hunters Point.

=== Literature ===
- Maya Angelou (1928–2014), writer
- Bob Kaufman (1925–1986), Beat Generation poet
- Devorah Major, Poet Laureate of San Francisco

=== Music ===
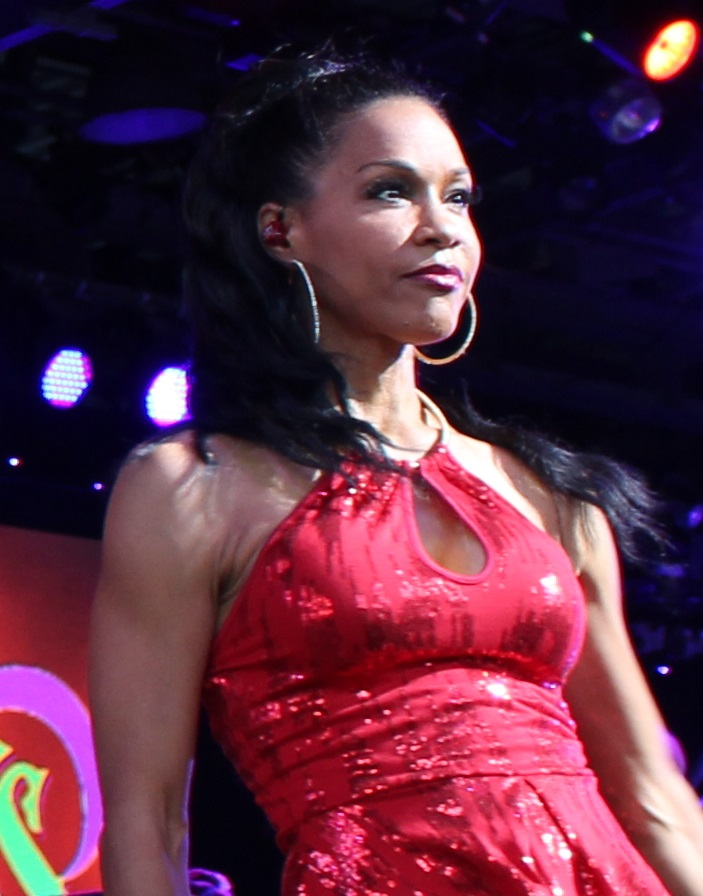
Cindy Herron of En Vogue EpcotMarch2015

- Johnny Mathis (born 1935), pop singer
- RBL Posse, gangsta rap group from Harbor Road public housing projects in Hunters Point
- 11/5, defunct gangsta rap group from the Oakdale public housing projects in Hunters Point
- Cindy Herron (born 1961), singer and founding member of En Vogue.
- Martin Luther McCoy (born 1975), actor, guitarist and musician.
- Larry June (born 1991), rapper from Bayview Hunters Point
- Prezi, rapper from Hunter's Point.
- Etta James (1938–2012), moved to San Francisco's Fillmore District at 12 years old.
- Sylvester (1947–1988), Los Angeles-born singer who found popularity in San Francisco in the 1970s.
- 24kGoldn (born 2000), biracial rapper of African American and Jewish descent.

=== Medical ===
- William Byron Rumford (1908–1986), a pharmacist and politician; at age 18 he moved to San Francisco.

=== Journalism ===
- Philip Alexander Bell (1808–1889), 19th century newspaper editor
- Carlton Benjamin Goodlett (1914–1997), owner of several newspapers.
- Thomas C. Fleming, newspaper reporter.

=== Sports ===
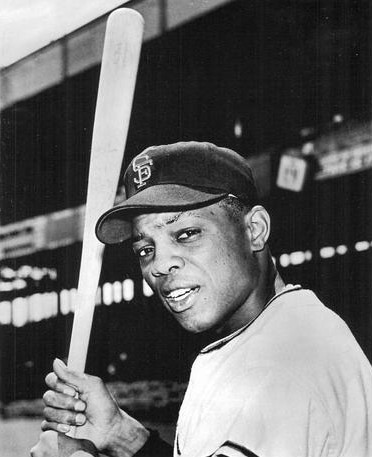
San Francisco Giants' player Willie Mays in 1961

- Willie Mays (born 1931), legendary baseball player for the San Francisco Giants
- John Nisby (1936–2011), former football player
- O. J. Simpson (born 1947), former football running back, actor, and broadcaster
- Desmond Bishop (born 1984), professional NFL player and coach
- Stevie Johnson (born 1986), NFL wide receiver, born and raised in Hunters Point before moving to Fairfield, California
- Eric Wright (born 1985), NFL player, cornerback for the San Francisco 49ers
- Donald Strickland (born 1980), NFL player, free agent cornerback who played for the San Francisco 49ers, Indianapolis Colts and New York Jets
- T. J. Ward (born 1986), NFL player, free agent Pro Bowl Safety who was drafted for the Cleveland Browns, and played for the Denver Broncos, with whom he won Super Bowl 50
- Karim Mayfield (born 1980), professional boxing champion from the Fillmore

=== Artists ===
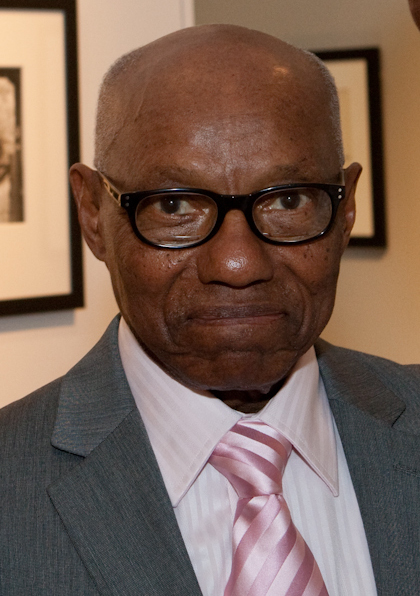
Photographer David Johnson at Opal Gallery March 25, 2010 (2)

- Mildred Howard (born 1945), sculptor and mixed media artist, was born in San Francisco and raised in Berkeley, California.
- Sargent Claude Johnson (1888–1967), a visual artist who studied painting, drawing and sculpting; he moved to San Francisco at the age of 27.
- David Johnson (1926–2024), a photographer known for his portrayal of the jazz culture in San Francisco's Fillmore District and civil rights movement figures; he moved to San Francisco at age 19, studied with Ansel Adams at the California School of Fine Arts (or San Francisco Art Institute).
- Hayward Ellis King (1928–1990), visual artist and curator, he was the first Black artist to serve as both director and curator of a major San Francisco Bay Area art gallery.
- Stanley Greene (1949–2017), artist and photojournalist, known for his coverage of the fall of the Berlin Wall, the genocide in Rwanda, and the Second Chechen War. Studied photography at the San Francisco Art Institute.
- H. Lenn Keller (1951–2020), filmmaker and photographer, known for her work co-founding and building the Bay Area Lesbian Archives in 2014, as well as her exhibitions at the San Francisco Public Library and the Oakland Museum of California.

== See also ==
- African Americans in California
- African Americans in the East San Francisco Bay Area
- Demographics of San Francisco
- First Black Lesbian Conference
- George Floyd protests in the San Francisco Bay Area
- History of the African Americans in Los Angeles
- Hispanic and Latino Americans in San Francisco
- History of the Japanese in San Francisco
- History of Chinese Americans in San Francisco
- History of the Jews in San Francisco
- Armenians in the San Francisco Bay Area
- Indian-Americans in the San Francisco Bay Area
