= Madame C.J. Walker Home for Girls and Women =

Building in San Francisco, built c. 1878

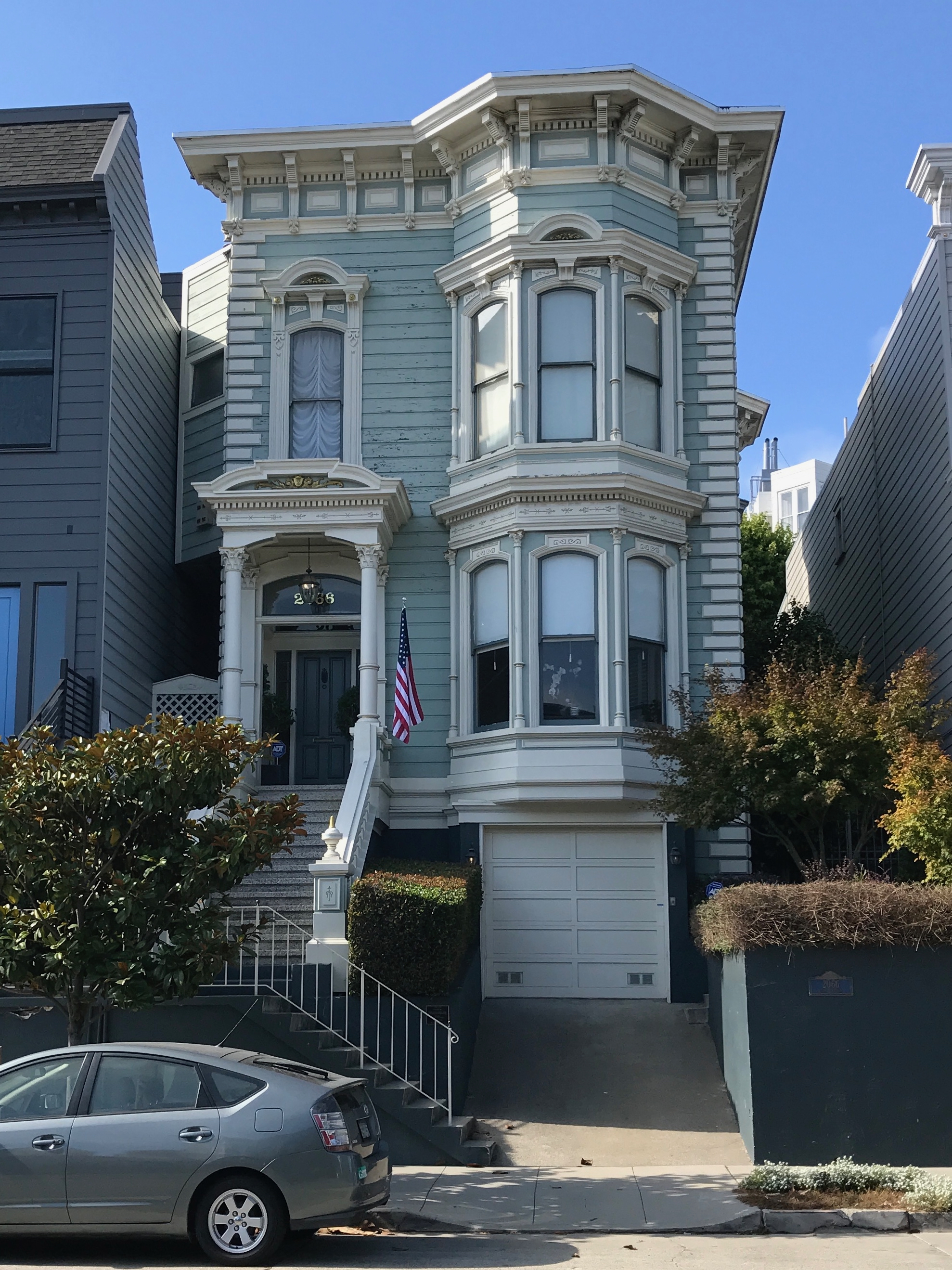

- Location within San Francisco County Location within California
- 37.788631°N 122.429895°W
- Location: 2066 Pine Street, San Francisco, California, United States

History
- Built: c. 1878 – c. 1879
- Built for: Third Baptist Church

Site notes
- Architectural style: Italianate style

San Francisco Designated Landmark
- Designated: December 12, 1999
- Reference no.: 211

The Madame C.J. Walker Home for Girls and Women, or simply Walker Home, is a historic Italianate building in the Lower Pacific Heights neighborhood (or Upper Fillmore) of San Francisco, California, U.S.. From 1921 to 1972, the building housed a charitable, community and social services organization for single African American woman new to San Francisco, who were not eligible to use the YWCA.

It is listed as a San Francisco Designated Landmark since 1999. The building is now a private residence and is not open to the public.

== History ==
The Madame C.J. Walker Home for Girls and Women was named after Madam C. J. Walker (1867–1919), an African American entrepreneur, philanthropist, and activist; and the first female self-made millionaire in the United States. The Walker Home was financially supported by the Third Baptist Church. It was opened by Irene Bell Ruggles, the president of the California State Federation of Colored Women's Clubs.

From 1921 to 1972, the building housed a community and social services program for single African American woman new to San Francisco, who were not eligible to use the services at the YWCA. The home primarily served to help women find affordable housing and local work, but also served as a community meeting place. In 1926, the basement of the building was converted into a social hall. In the 1930s, the "Beauticians Club" met at the Walker Home. During World War II, the Walker Home became a vital part of the community, supporting an influx of population growth of African Americans moving to the area.

In 1972, the program was moved to Hayes Street and the building was sold as a private residence.

== See also ==
- List of San Francisco Designated Landmarks
- African Americans in San Francisco
