= Sam Jordan's Bar =

Historic building in San Francisco, California

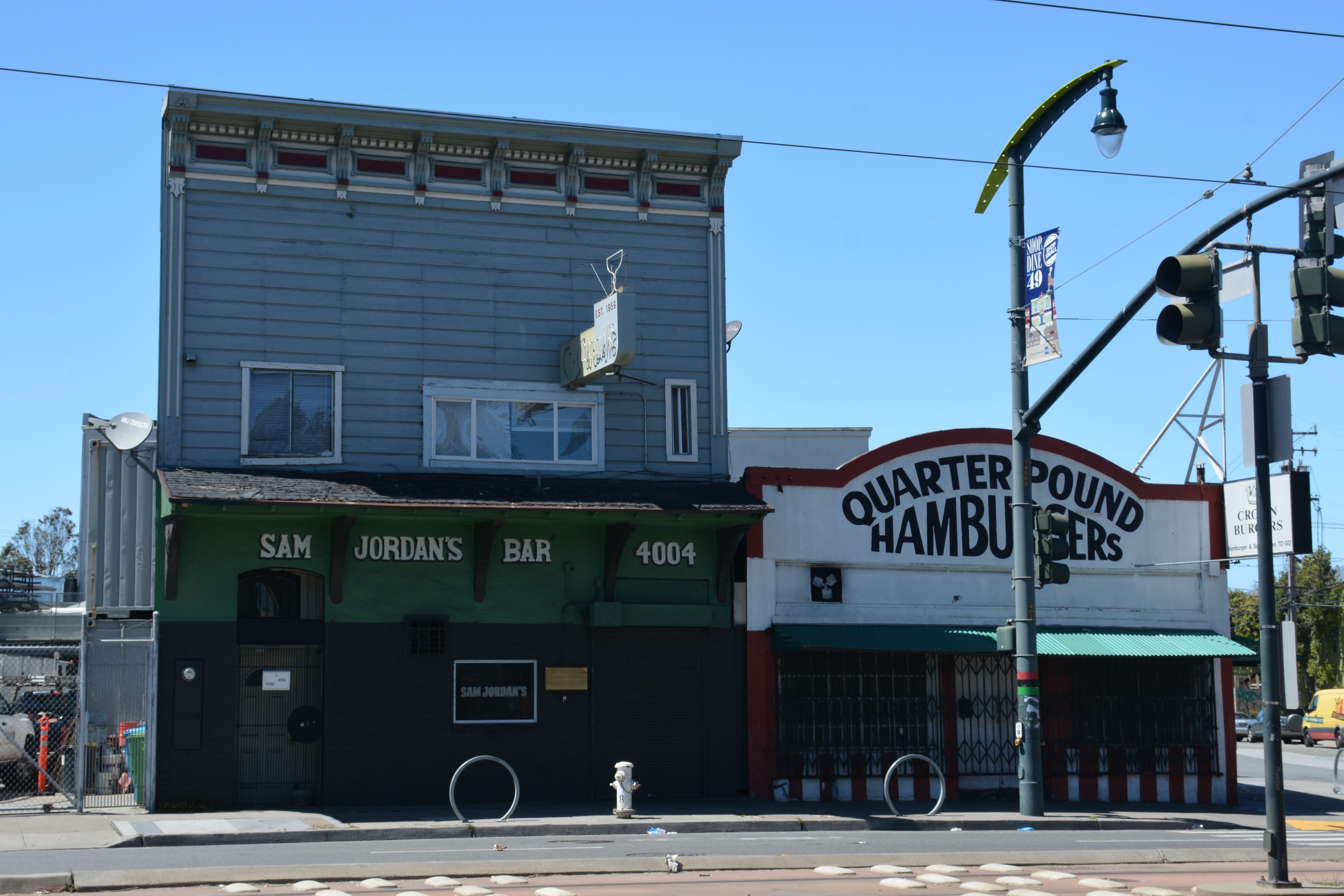

- Location within San Francisco County Location within California
- 37.741077°N 122.388860°W
- Location: 4004–4006 3rd Street, San Francisco, California, U.S.

San Francisco Designated Landmark
- Designated: February 6, 2013
- Reference no.: 263

Sam Jordan's Bar is a historic building and a former working-class neighborhood bar (open from 1959 to 2019) located at 4004–4006 3rd Street in the Bayview neighborhood of San Francisco, California, U.S. It is a San Francisco Designated Landmark (number 263) since February 6, 2013. It also went by the name Sam Jordan's Bar and Grill.

== History ==
It was founded by Sam Jordan, a light-heavyweight boxer and U. S. Navy World War II veteran. Jordan won the championship diamond belt in 1948. For 60 years the bar served as a gathering place for Bayview's community, and it was the oldest black-owned bar in the city. The space served as a bar, a barbecue restaurant, and a nightclub.

Sam Jordan's Bar appeared on the television series Bar Rescue (season 5, episode 8) in 2016, and received a remodel. It closed in November 2019, after financially struggling for many years.

== See also ==
- African Americans in San Francisco
- List of San Francisco Designated Landmarks
