= Amos Brown =

Pastor and civil rights activist

Amos C. Brown
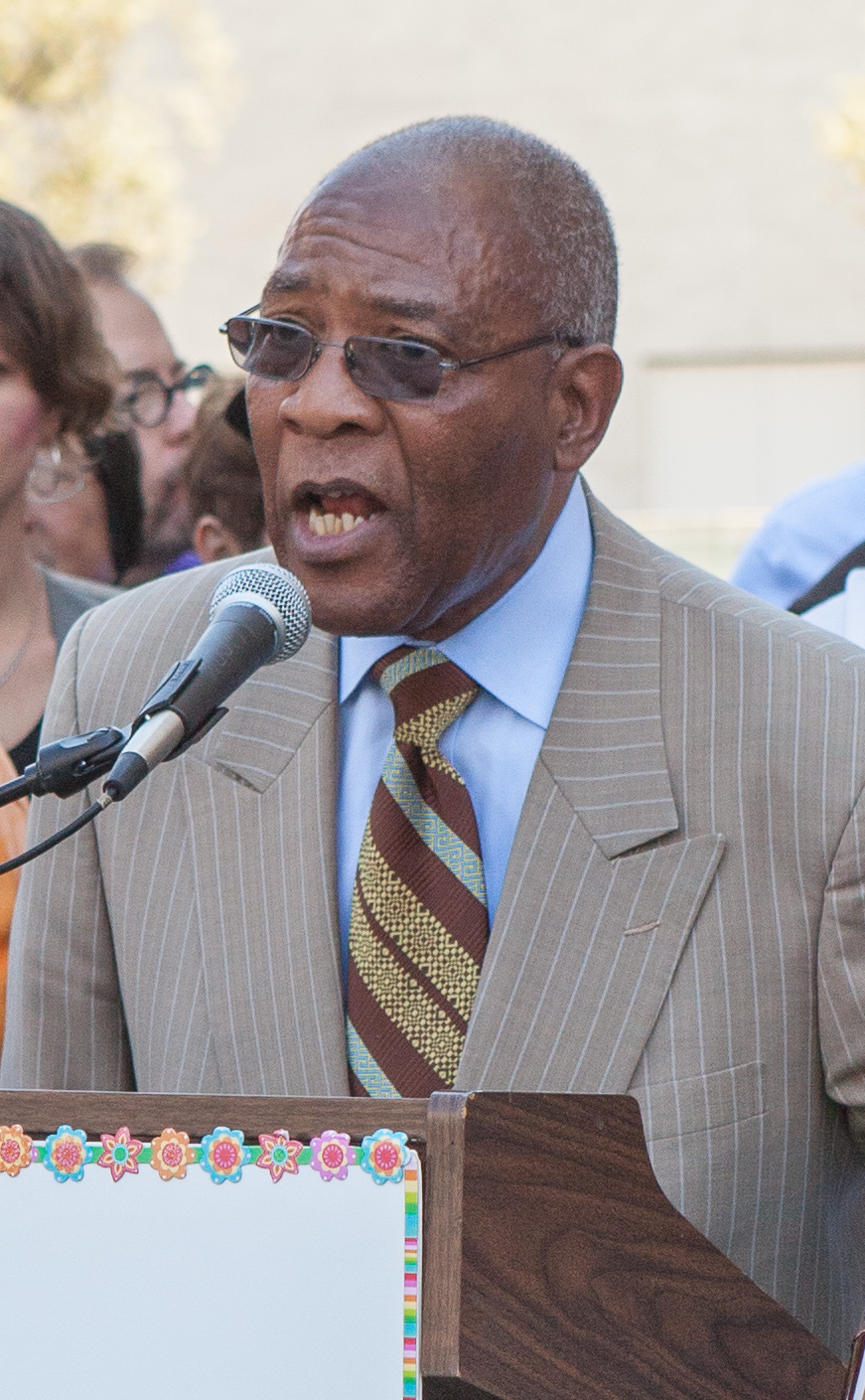
- Brown in 2013

Member of the San Francisco Board of Supervisors for the at-large district
- In office June 1, 1996 – January 8, 2001
- Preceded by: Carole Migden
- Succeeded by: Gerardo Sandoval (redistricted)

Personal details
- Born: Amos Cleophilus Brown; February 20, 1941 (age 85) Jackson, Mississippi, U.S.
- Spouse: Jane Smith Brown
- Education: Morehouse College (BA); Crozer Theological Seminary (M.Div.); United Theological Seminary (D.Min)
- Occupation: Pastor; activist; politician

Amos Cleophilus Brown (born February 20, 1941) is an African American pastor and civil rights activist. He is the president of the San Francisco branch of the NAACP, and was head pastor of the Third Baptist Church of San Francisco from 1976 through 2025. Brown was one of only eight students who took the only college class ever taught by Martin Luther King Jr. He serves on the board of the California Reparations Task Force.

== Early life and education ==
Brown was born in Jackson, Mississippi, in 1941. His great-grandfather was born a slave in Franklin County, Mississippi. Brown's father worked as a rural church pastor and janitor.

In 1955, Brown organized the NAACP's first youth council. He first met Martin Luther King at the 1956 NAACP national convention in San Francisco, which he attended at the invitation of Medgar Evers, who drove Brown there personally.

In 1959, Brown criticized segregated schools in an interview with the Cleveland Plain Dealer. In response, he was barred from returning for his senior year at the then-segregated Jim Hill High School. Medgar Evers, then field secretary of the NAACP, intervened, threatening a lawsuit to force desegregation of a nearby white high school. Brown was let back into Jim Hill, but thereafter the student council, of which he was president, was abolished in order to terminate his leadership role; and he was barred from the position of senior class president which his classmates later elected him to; and he was relegated to salutatorian although he earned the higher academic honor of valedictorian.

Brown attended Morehouse College, graduating in 1964, and then entered Crozer Theological Seminary. Martin Luther King wrote one of Brown's recommendation letters. J. Pius Barbour acted as the "unofficial dean" of the black students at the school, his own alma mater. Brown attended a seminar in social philosophy that King co-taught with college minister Samuel Woodrow Williams. Brown was one of only eight students hand-selected for the class.

After earning a master of divinity (M.Div.) from Crozer, Brown later went on to receive a doctor of ministry from United Theological Seminary.

== Career and activism ==
Brown became senior pastor of the Third Baptist Church of San Francisco in 1976. He has served as national chairman for the NAACP Youth and College Division and the National Baptist Commission on Civil Rights. He is president of the San Francisco branch of the NAACP. He is also on the board of directors of the NAACP.

In 1991, Brown testified at the Clarence Thomas Supreme Court nomination hearings on behalf of the National Baptist Convention of America, the National Baptist Convention, USA, Inc., and the Progressive National Baptist Convention. He stated that the votes of the conventions were virtually unanimous in their opposition to the nomination of Thomas.

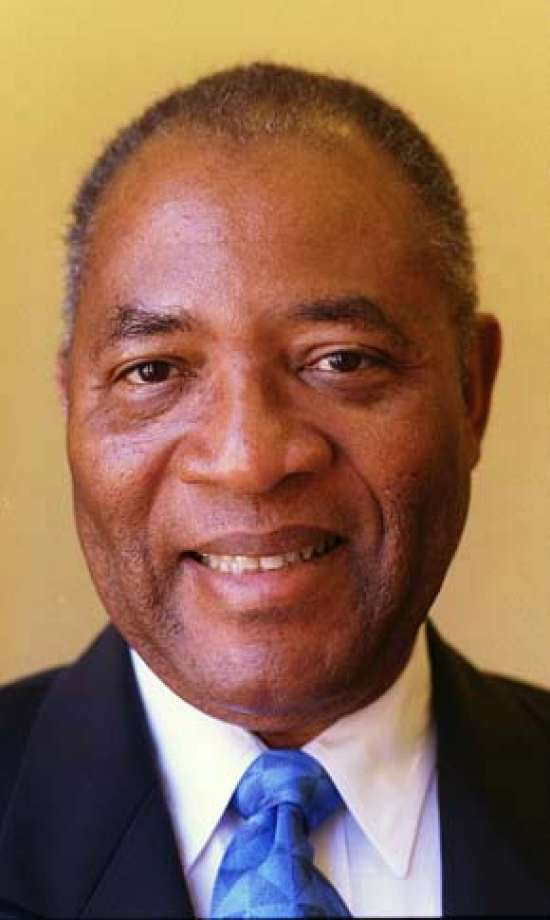
Amos C. Brown was a member of the San Francisco Board of Supervisors in 1998.

Brown served on the San Francisco Board of Supervisors from 1996 to 2001. He was originally appointed by Mayor Willie Brown in 1996, then elected to a two-year term in 1999. While a member of the Board of Supervisors, he proposed an ordinance that would prohibit standing on a street corner for more than five minutes, with loiterers facing a $250 fine and up to six months imprisonment. He failed to win re-election to the board in the year 2000.

Brown said in an interview that the origins of the student sit-in movement has been "romanticized... or mis-stated". According to Brown, the first organized "sit-down movement", as it was then referred to, was in Oklahoma City in August 1958, led by the NAACP Youth Council. In 1961, Brown was arrested along with Martin Luther King Jr. at a lunch counter sit-in. He also joined the Freedom Riders that year.

Brown is a supporter of LGBT rights. He spoke in favor of the California gay rights bill in 1991.

After the September 11 attacks, Brown attracted attention for comments he made during a September 17, 2001 memorial service at Bill Graham Civic Auditorium for victims of the attack. Brown said: "America, America, what did you do -- either intentionally or unintentionally -- in the world order, in Central America, in Africa where bombs are still blasting? America, what did you do in the global warming conference when you did not embrace the smaller nations? America, what did you do two weeks ago when I stood at the world conference on racism, when you wouldn't show up?" U.S. Representative Nancy Pelosi, a Democrat representing San Francisco in Congress, was the only politician to condemn Brown, stating: "the act of terrorism on Sept. 11 put those people outside the order of civilized behavior, and we will not take responsibility for that."

He faced criticism from some black ministers for his support of same-sex marriage and opposition to Proposition 8 in California in 2008. In 2012, he joined the NAACP National Board in voting overwhelmingly in favor of supporting marriage equality. Brown supports the legalization of marijuana, and has called for more African Americans to have a voice in the medical cannabis industry.

Brown has called for reparations to be paid to black people, to aid in economic empowerment and compensate for deficiencies in education.

Brown volunteered for Operation Crossroads Africa in 1964, spending over two months on the west coast of Africa. He has visited the continent over 20 times since then. Under his leadership, the Third Baptist Church has sponsored many African refugees, and enabled 80 children from Tanzania to receive heart surgery in the United States.

In late December 2023, rapper and small business owner Xiao Chuan, also known as Chino Yang, accused Brown of intimidation. After Chuan released a music video that criticized Mayor London Breed for San Francisco's high crime rates, Brown allegedly confronted him at his business. According to Chuan, Brown demanded that the rapper repudiate the song and apologize, threatening to organize the city's black community against him if he did not. Brown denied that he had threatened Chuan, but later apologized for his actions.

In June 2025, Brown announced he would be stepping down from his position as head pastor of Third Baptist Church, in a move he referred to as "repositioning" rather than retirement.

== Awards and recognition ==
- Martin Luther King Jr. Ministerial Award
- NAACP Spingarn Medal
