= Christopher Muhammad =

American minister and activist

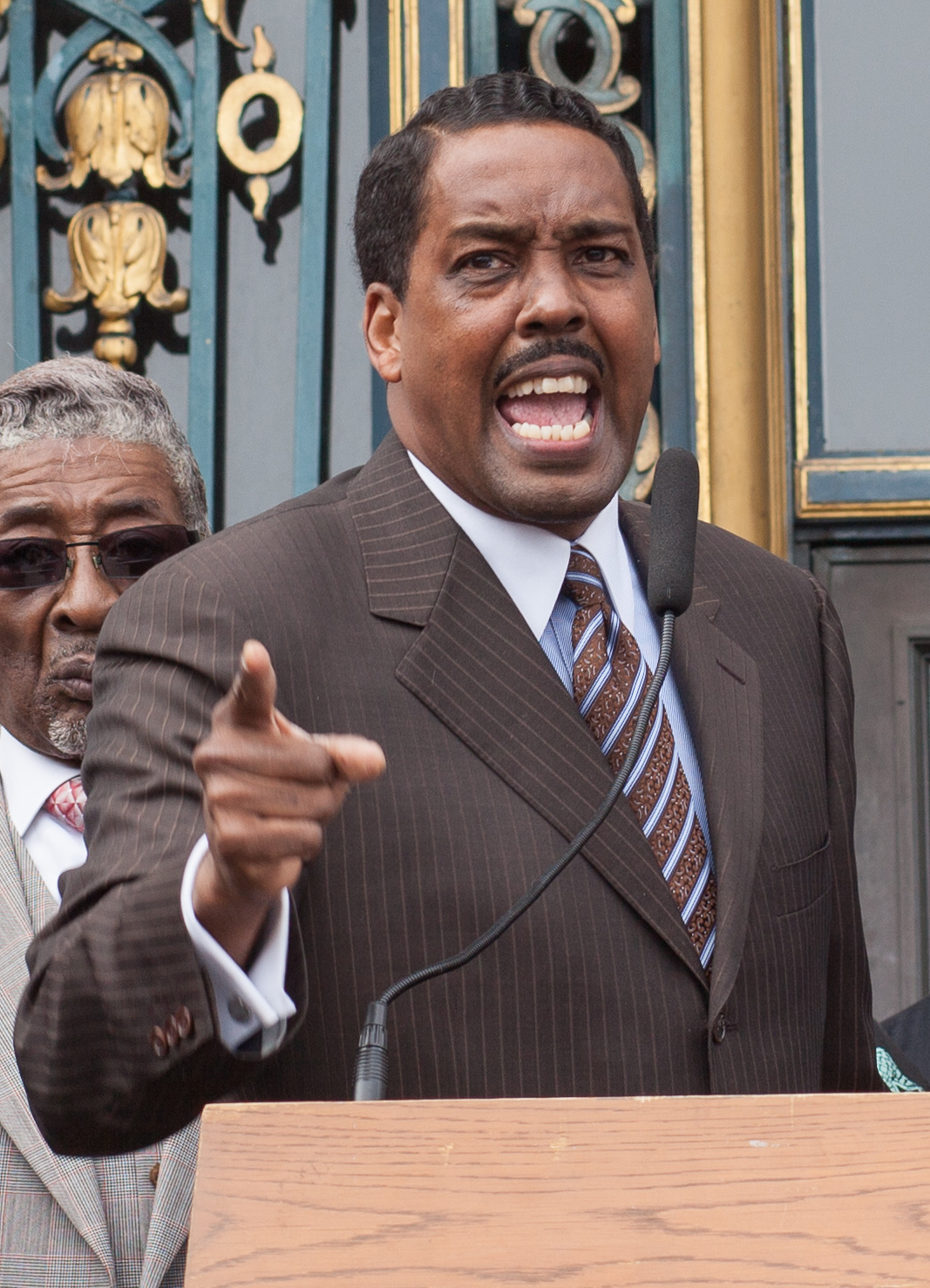
- Muhammad at March 2016 protest against police violence in San Francisco
- Occupation: Minister • activist

Christopher Muhammad is an American minister and activist, and serves as the San Francisco Bay Area minister of the Nation of Islam. He is known for his campaign against the Lennar Corporation, which he believes has released asbestos dust into the local community.

== Background ==
Muhammad converted to the Nation of Islam after developing a distrust of local authorities and businesses. His father contracted esophageal cancer after many years as a bus mechanic, which he believed had been caused by his working conditions. According to Muhammad, "the bus company drew out the lawsuit until after he died so it wouldn't have to pay a cent".

== Lennar Corporation activism ==
Muhammad has received media attention for numerous community activities. Most prominently, Muhammad has been an outspoken critic of the Lennar Corporation, and has charged them with harming children in the neighborhood of Bayview-Hunters Point, San Francisco. Muhammad claims that children at the Muhammad University of Islam, the local NOI school, have been suffering from respiratory problems because of dust created during demolition and building work carried out by Lennar at a nearby site. Specifically, he charges that dangerous amounts of asbestos dust have been released. Lennar Corporation, as well as city officials, say that the claims are unfounded.
