= David Johnson (photographer) =

American photographer (1926–2024)

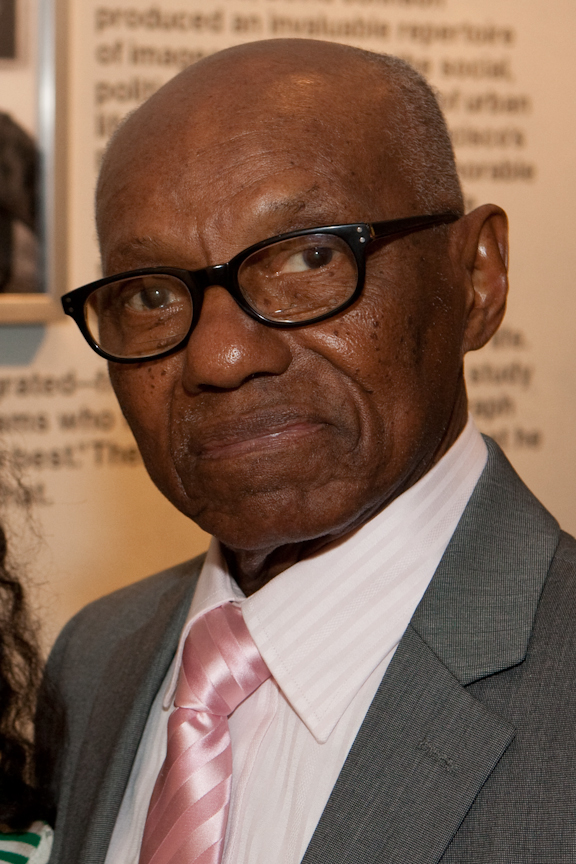
- Johnson in 2010
- Born: August 3, 1926; Jacksonville, Florida, U.S.
- Died: March 1, 2024 (aged 97); Greenbrae, California, U.S.
- Known for: Photography
- Spouses: Lucy Ellis (died 2008); Jacqueline Sue
- Children: 4

David S. Johnson (August 3, 1926 – March 1, 2024) was an American photographer. He was known for his portrayal of society, urban life, and the jazz culture of San Francisco's Fillmore District in the 1940s and 1950s, as well as figures of the civil rights movement of the 1960s. Born in Florida under segregation and trained at the California School of Fine Arts, he was the first African American student of photographer Ansel Adams.

Johnson's work was largely overlooked until the early 2000s, when his works were featured in a documentary on the history of the Fillmore District. His photographs have since appeared in several books and gallery exhibits, and a selection was purchased by the Library of Congress. His collection is archived in the Bancroft Library of the University of California, Berkeley.

== Early life ==
Johnson was born on August 3, 1926, in Jacksonville, Florida, and was raised by his foster parents, Alice Johnson (from whom he took his name) and John Henry. He grew up poor in segregated Florida, and his foster father was sent to prison when David was four. David was the only person in his household who could read or write. He attended Lewis Grade School and Stanton High School in Jacksonville. He developed an interest in photography as a child after winning a camera in a contest, and his desire to become a photographer was solidified in high school during a summer trip to Washington, D. C.

Before finishing high school he was drafted into the U.S. Navy during World War II. He visited San Francisco during his time with the Navy, then was deployed to the Philippines. Upon returning to Jacksonville he read that Ansel Adams had established a fine art photography program at the California School of Fine Arts. With no formal training in photography but equipped with G.I. Bill funds, Johnson wrote to Adams requesting admission to the program, informing Adams he was black. Adams replied that race did not matter, but that the classes were full. After a student dropped out, creating a vacancy, Adams wrote again, inviting Johnson to join the program, and to live with Adams until he found a place to live.

== San Francisco ==
Johnson arrived in San Francisco in 1945, and lived for a time at Adams' home in the Sea Cliff neighborhood, becoming his first black student. Johnson credits Adams with teaching him to visualize a shot before it is taken, and said his interest in documentary photography was sparked by Adams photographing the Japanese internment camps. Johnson became part of the School of Fine Art's "Golden Decade" (1945–1955), a group of photography students who trained under noted artists like Adams, Imogen Cunningham, Dorothea Lange and Minor White.

Clarence (1947) is considered one of Johnson's signature works.

Johnson soon discovered the Fillmore District, a neighborhood that was home to a large majority of the city's rapidly growing African American population. His photographs are some of the only photos of African American life in the Fillmore before urban redevelopment of the 1960s. His subjects included children, community members, activists, and musicians, and he photographed prominent African Americans in politics, society, and civil rights, including Langston Hughes, Thurgood Marshall, Jackie Robinson, W. E. B. Du Bois, and Willie Brown. A popular photograph, and one of Johnson's own favorites, is of a 5-year-old boy sitting on the steps of a church. Entitled Clarence, it was the San Francisco Chronicle's Picture of the Week in 1947, and the first photograph for which Johnson was paid.

Johnson graduated in 1949, and with his wife, Lucy, opened the Johnson Photography Studio in San Francisco's Western Addition neighborhood. He also worked as a post office clerk and as freelance photojournalist with the Sun Reporter and other Bay Area papers. At the post office he became active in the worker's union, and in 1953 became president of the San Francisco chapter of the National Alliance of Postal Employees, a chapter he had helped establish. He became involved with San Francisco politics and the local NAACP chapter, and was sent as a delegate to photograph the 1963 March on Washington. Eventually he was unable to financially sustain his photography business and closed his studio, giving up professional photography while pursuing social and community work.

He became involved with the local Republican Party and ran unsuccessfully for San Francisco County sheriff in 1968. Shortly after, he was hired by the University of California, San Francisco (UCSF), where he worked in the personnel department to recruit minority employees. He was a founding member of the UCSF Black Caucus and received the Chancellor's Public Service Award in 1976. He retired from UCSF in 1983, and at age 65 returned to school, earning a master's degree in social work from Barry University in Miami, Florida. He returned to the San Francisco Bay Area and became a social worker for foster families.

== Later years ==
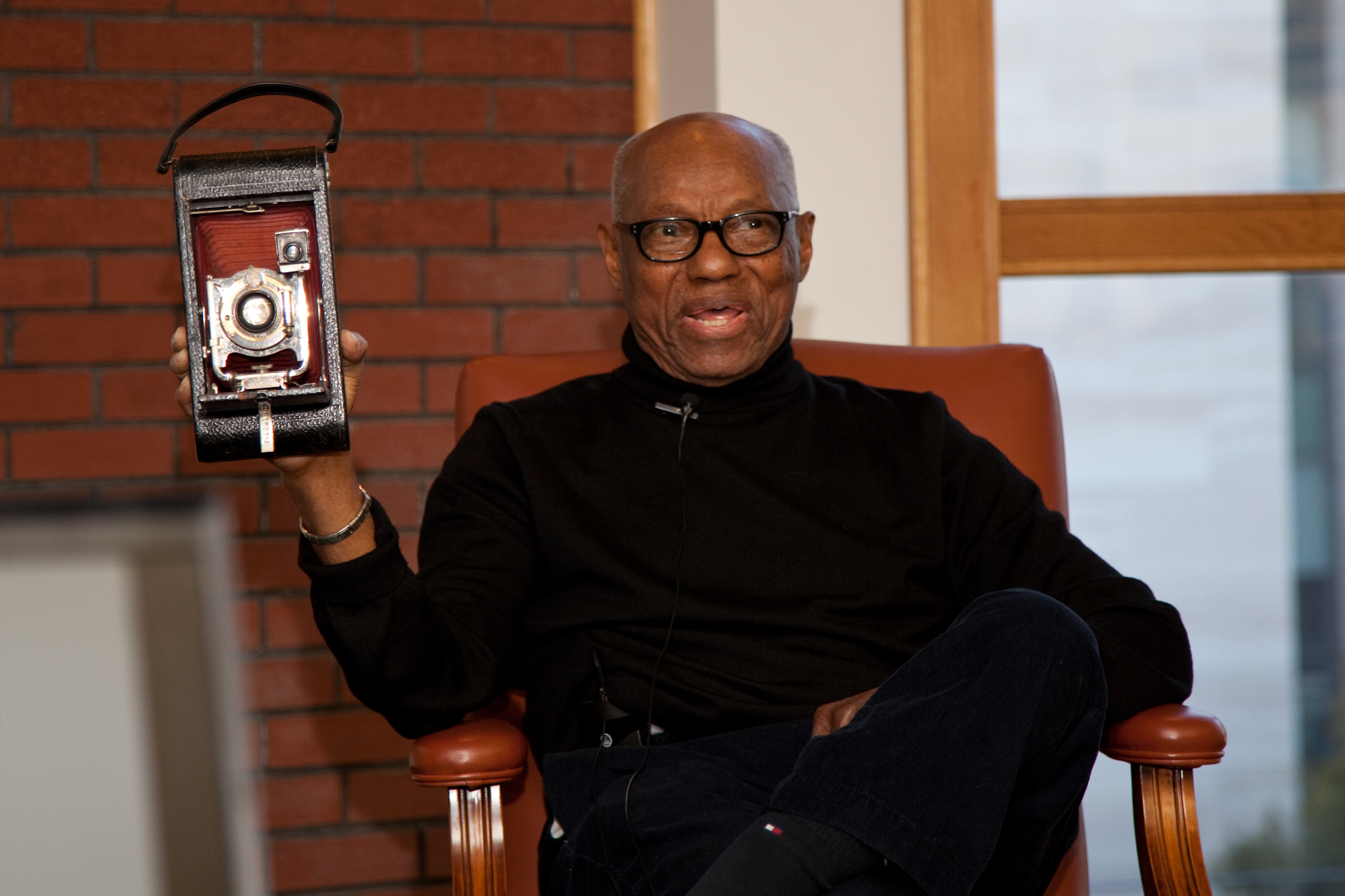
Johnson shows his original folding camera at a 2010 talk

In 1999, his daughter encouraged him to submit photographs to a KQED documentary on the history of the Fillmore District. The documentary subsequently included 17 historic photographs of Johnson's, and renewed his photography career. In the summer of 2000, an exhibition of his Fillmore collection was held at Fort Mason and the Center for African and African American Art and Culture. Exhibits of historic and contemporary photographs followed, including showings at California State University, Chico, the University of California, Merced, and galleries in Atlanta and Washington, D. C.

Johnson was the recipient of the Certificate of Honor in Photography from Mayor of San Francisco Gavin Newsom in 2004, and the Fillmore Heritage Pioneer Award in 2011. In 2012 he produced a book, A Dream Begun So Long Ago, written by his wife Jacqueline Annette Sue. He has served as chairman of the Mayor's Committee to Restore Haight Ashbury and as past president of the San Francisco African American Historical & Cultural Society. His name is engraved in the sidewalk of the Fillmore's Gene Suttle Plaza. In 2017, his name was among the contenders to replace the name of San Francisco's Justin Herman Plaza.

Johnson considered himself a modern-day "griot", a story teller, historian and narrator of West African culture. In later years, while remaining active in photography, he shifted towards preserving his legacy, and as of 2015 was working on a project on the black slaves of Sullivan's Island, South Carolina. In 2016 the Bancroft Library at the University of California, Berkeley acquired Johnson's archive of some 5,000 negatives and prints, the first collection of an African American photographer to be archived in the library.

== Personal life ==
Johnson had four children with his first wife, Lucy Ellis, who died in 2008. He later married Jacqueline Annette Sue, an author. He was a long-time resident of San Francisco's Fillmore District, and later relocated to Marin County, where he resided in Greenbrae, California. David Johnson died from complications of dementia and pneumonia at his home on March 1, 2024, at the age of 97.
