= Hispanic and Latino Americans in San Francisco =

Hispanic and Latino Americans in San Francisco form 15.1% of the population. The city's population includes 121,744 Hispanics or Latinos of any race. The principal Hispanic groups in the city were those of Mexican (7.4%), Salvadoran (2.0%), Nicaraguan (0.9%), Guatemalan (0.8%), and Puerto Rican (0.5%) ancestry. The Hispanic population is most heavily concentrated in the Tenderloin, Mission District, Crocker-Amazon, Outer Mission, and Excelsior District. San Mateo County cities such as Daly City, San Bruno, Colma, Millbrae and South San Francisco.

== History ==
Historically, San Francisco had a large population of Chileans during the California gold rush (1848–1852). The Little Chile neighbourhood in San Francisco, where many Chileans resided, was known for the prostitution that occurred in it.

== Mission District ==
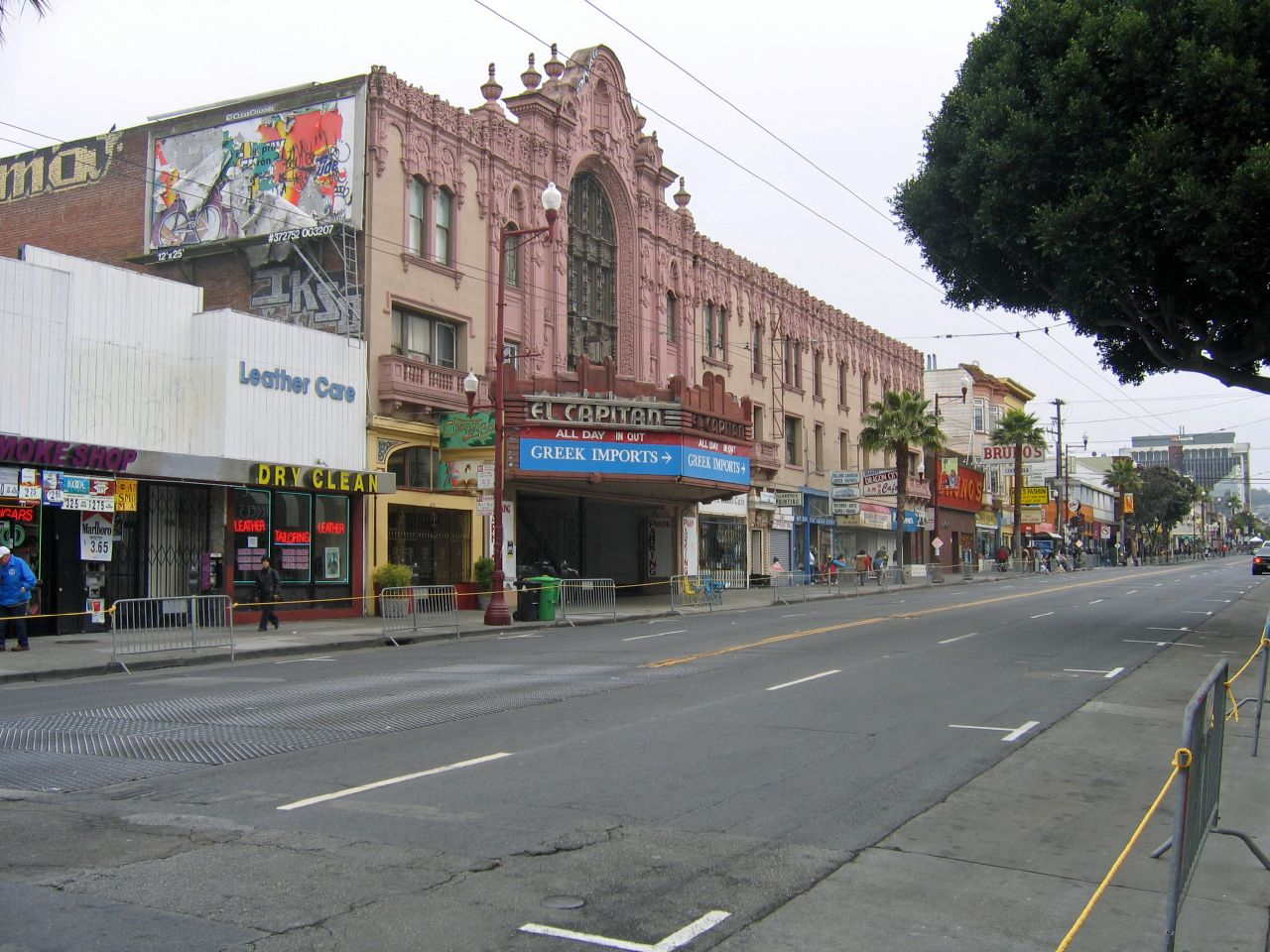
Mission District is center of San Francisco's Latino community.

Ranchos owned by Spanish-Mexican families such as the Valenciano, Guerrero, Dolores, Bernal, Noé and De Haro continued in the area, separated from the town of Yerba Buena, later renamed San Francisco (centered around Portsmouth Square) by a two-mile wooden plank road (later paved and renamed Mission Street).

The lands around the nearly abandoned mission church became a focal point of raffish attractions including bull and bear fighting, horse racing, baseball and dueling. A famous beer parlor resort known as The Willows was located along Mission Creek just south of 18th Street between Mission Street and San Carlos Street. From 1865 to 1891, a large conservatory and zoo known as Woodward's Gardens covered two city blocks bounded by Mission Street, Valencia Street, 13th Street, and 15th Street. In the decades after the Gold Rush, the town of San Francisco quickly expanded, and the Mission lands were developed and subdivided into housing plots for working-class immigrants, largely German, Irish, and Italian, and also for industrial uses.

The Mission District began seeing waves of Mexican immigrants from the 1940s to 1960s. There are also sizable populations of Central Americans such as Hondurans and Nicaraguans in this neighborhood, as well as with some Hispanic population around this era and later decades taking residence in the Excelsior District. The areas of Sunnydale, Visitacion Valley, and pockets of Sunset District, Richmond District, SoMa, and Eureka Valley have sizeable Latino communities.

To a lesser extent, there are some South American residents in San Francisco, with a higher proportion of them living in the Mission District and Downtown areas. The Peruvian population also is plentiful in San Mateo County, especially in the city San Mateo.

There are some Puerto Ricans in the Bay Area, albeit in way lower numbers than the East Coast and Florida. Larger populations of Puerto Ricans are reported in Vallejo, Suisun City, Newark, and Mission District.

== Bay Area at large ==
San Francisco Bay Area in general has a large Hispanic population at around 30%, represented at least 20% in every county, with Marin being the least in proportion. Hispanic population is heavily concentrated in the South Bay and East Bay in comparison to San Francisco's, which is a lower 16%. The Hispanic population has been in the Bay Area since the mid-1900s, which much of the immigration due to farmers working in the Wine County and agriculture of the San Jose's valleys. In San Jose, East San Jose, and Washington-Guadalupe are center of San Jose's Mexican and Central American communities.

In Santa Rosa, there exists a large Hispanic, chiefly Mexican population in south Santa Rosa and west Santa Rosa. This includes the community of Roseland. There is also a presence of Latinos in Vallejo and Fairfield. In Oakland, the Fruitvale neighborhood is home to a large Mexican and Central American population, and there is a large population of Latinos in Richmond, with a population having initiated immensely since the 1980s.

East Palo Alto is predominately Latino as well as Menlo Park.

Canal District has Mexican and Guatemalan communities, and the Canal District is a center of Marin’s population.

There are some Latino politicians from the Bay Area; Jesse Arreguín was elected the first mayor of a Bay Area city, population over 100,000; mayor of Berkeley elected in October 2015.

Marin County, especially in San Rafael’s Canal Street district, has many Mexicans, Salvadorans and Guatemalans.

== Arts and celebrations ==
San Francisco has a Cine+Mas Latino film festival, Carnaval celebrations, and Afro-Peruvian dance festivals.

== Notable residents ==
- Baby Bash is half-Latino from Vallejo.
- Snow tha Product is Latino born in San Jose.
- Berner is a Latino rapper from San Francisco.
- Jerry Garcia had Galician roots, born in San Francisco.

== Sources ==
- Cordova, Cary (2017). The Heart of the Mission: Latino Art and Politics in San Francisco. University of Pennsylvania Press. ISBN 9780812294149.
- Godfrey, Brian J. (2004). "Barrio Under Siege: Latino Sense of Place in San Francisco, California". In Arreola, Daniel D. (ed.). Hispanic Spaces, Latino Places: Community and Cultural Diversity in Contemporary America. University of Texas Press. ISBN 9780292783997.
- Sandoval, Tomás F. Summers Jr. (2013). Latinos at the Golden Gate: Creating Community and Identity in San Francisco. University of North Carolina Press. ISBN 9781469607665.

https://data.census.gov/table?q=B03001&g=160XX00US0667000
