= Westmob =

Gang based in San Francisco, California

Westmob, is a primarily African-American street gang located in San Francisco, California. Since 1999, they have been in conflict with the Big Block gang, which is its major rival in the area. Westmob is known to associate with the Oakdale Mob and Sunnydale Gangsters. Its rivalry with Big Block was the subject of the 2002 documentary Straight Outta Hunters Point and is linked to rap and drugs. They claim territory from West Point to Middle Point in San Francisco's notoriously dangerous Hunters Point projects.

The gang made headlines around the nation when one of its members, David Hill, was arrested for murdering a police officer in April 2004.

In 2013, two Westmob members were convicted of a 2009 shooting in Hunters Point.
