= Third Baptist Church (San Francisco) =

Third Baptist Church of San Francisco
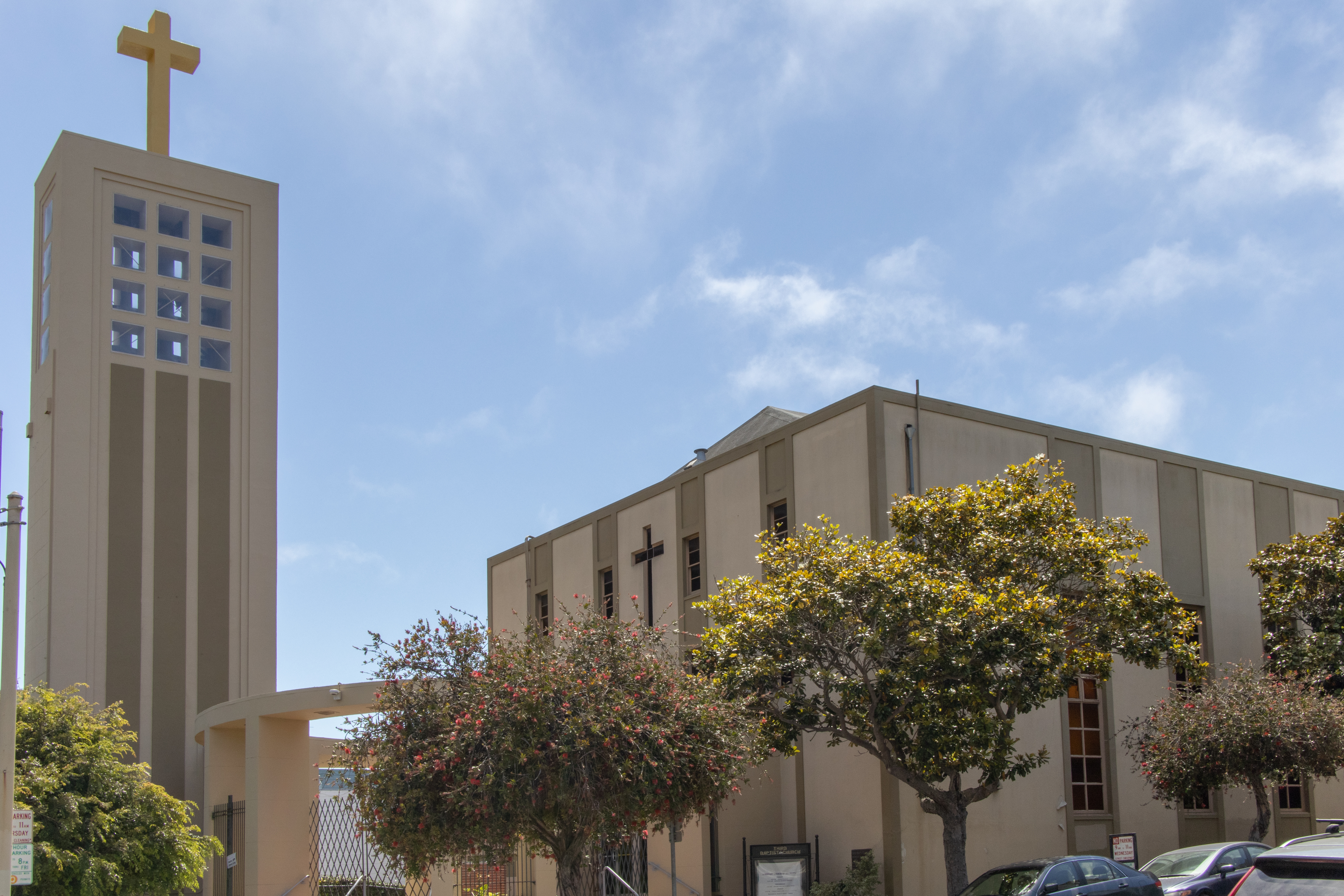

- Location within San Francisco County Location within California
- 37.778513°N 122.434922°W
- Location: 1399 McAllister Street, San Francisco, California, U.S.

History
- Founded: 1852
- Built: 1952

Site notes
- Architect: William F. Gunnison

San Francisco Designated Landmark
- Designated: November 15, 2017
- Reference no.: 275
- Other name: Third Baptist Church Complex

The Third Baptist Church of San Francisco, formerly the First Colored Baptist Church of San Francisco, is an African-American Baptist church located in the Western Addition neighborhood of San Francisco, California affiliated with the American Baptist Churches USA. Established in 1852, it is San Francisco's oldest African-American church. Third Baptist has occupied several buildings in San Francisco over the course of its history. Its current building, the Third Baptist Church Complex, was listed as a San Francisco Designated Landmark on November 15, 2017.

== History ==
In August 1852, the First Colored Baptist Church congregation was founded in the house of Eliza and William Davis, by Black parishioners including the Davis family, Abraham Brown, Thomas Bundy, Harry Fields, Thomas Davenport, Willie Denton, George Lewis, and Fielding Spotts. Prior to 1852, African American Baptist parishioners attended the primarily-white First Baptist Church, and were forced to sit in the balcony. Other African American churches founded in 1852 in San Francisco included Bethel African Methodist Episcopal Church (Bethel AME Church), and the First African Methodist Episcopal Zion Church (First AME Zion Church).

The first location of the church building was founded in 1852 at the corner Grant Avenue and Greenwich Street in San Francisco. The former Grant Avenue location is listed as a California Historical Landmark (Number 1010) since February 16, 1993.

In 1854, the church was moved to Dupont Street at Greenwich Street, the location was the former First Baptist Church. A year later in 1855, the church was renamed as the Third Baptist Church with the name legally changed in 1908.

From 1921 until 1972, the church operated the Madame C.J. Walker Home for Girls and Women, a charitable, community and social services organization for single African American woman new to San Francisco, who were not eligible to use the YWCA.

The church building at 1399 McAllister Street was designed by architect William F. Gunnison and completed in 1952. In 1958, W. E. B. Du Bois spoke to the church congregation.

From 1976 to 2025, Rev. Amos C. Brown was the pastor, and was succeeded by Rev. Devon Jerome Crawford on July 1, 2025.

== Pastors ==
- Rev. Charles Satchell, 1857 to 1858;
- Rev. J. H. Kelley, March 14, 1869, to ?;
- Rev. Frederick Douglas Haynes Sr., August 29, 1932 to 1971;
- Rev. Frederick Douglas Haynes Jr., June 25, 1972 to September 3, 1975;
- Rev. Amos C. Brown, September 19, 1976 to June 30, 2025;
- Rev. Devon Jerome Crawford, July 1, 2025, to present

== Notable members ==
- Kamala Harris

== See also ==
- African Americans in California
- Black church
- List of San Francisco Designated Landmarks
- Racial segregation of churches in the United States
