= Devorah Major =

American poet

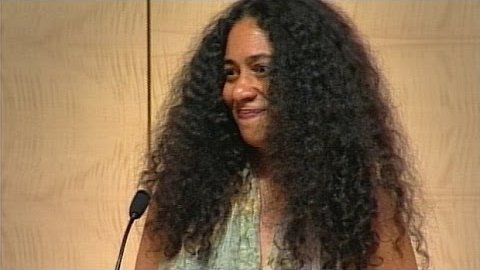
- Born: Berkeley
- Education: San Francisco State University
- Known for: San Francisco's third Poet Laureate
- Website: http://www.devorahmajor.com/

Devorah Major is an American writer, poet, performer, essayist, editor, recording artist, and professor. She has won awards in poetry, fiction, and creative non-fiction and is San Francisco's third Poet Laureate.

== Education and career ==
Major born on January 8, 1952, the daughter of Reginald Allman and Helen Gabriel Major. She went on to graduate from San Francisco State University in 1976 where she studied African-American Studies and Health Education. Previously Devorah worked as a librarian. She became a part-time senior adjunct professor at the California College of the Arts.

== Biography ==
Major has toured Africa, the Caribbean, South America, Europe, and the United States performing her poetry and speaking on panels focused on African-American poetry, Beat poetry, and poetry of resistance. She is the author of three novels, five books of poetry and numerous other single pieces of poetry and writings. Major's work tends to follow a general theme of being, family, and community. This theme can be seen in her first novel, An Open Weave, where the story focuses on members of an extended African American family. The basis of her second novel, Brown Glass Windows, similarly highlights a large African American family in San Francisco. In Spring 2002, she was named San Francisco's poet laureate. Her fifth book of poetry, and then we became was published by City Lights. This piece of poetry contemplates a combination of what it means to be human with ideas about the universe.

On top of her personal theme, involving family and relationships, exhibited in her work, Major has said that Lucille Clifton has been an inspiration for much of her work. Originally named Thelma Lucille Sayles, Lucille Clifton was born June 27, 1936, in Depew, NY and died on February 13, 2010, in Baltimore, Maryland. An American poet, whose work serves as an inspiration for Major, comparably examined family life, gender, and racism. Clifton attended Howard University from 1953 to 1955 and graduated from Fredonia State Teachers College in 1955. Her expressive and powerful work in poetry named her poet laureate of Maryland from 1979 to 1985. She was also awarded many honors including the Ruth Lilly Poetry Prize in 2007.

Major has been involved in the Daughters of Yam, a poetry performance group with Opal Palmer Adisa, for over twenty years. This group as a whole has released two chapbooks, one book, a poetry and jazz cassette, and a poetry and jazz CD. Major has also edited and written six introductions for student poetry anthologies by the Fine Arts Museums Poets.

Prior to teaching at California College of the Arts, Major taught at New College, and lectured at Stanford University, San Jose State, and Humboldt College. She held workshops for poetry performance at Laney College and has led individual writing sessions.

== Bibliography ==
- An Open Weave. Seal Press. 1995. ISBN 9781878067661
- Street Smarts. Curbstone Books. 1996. ISBN 9781880684276
- Browned Glass Windows. Curbstone Books. 2002. ISBN 9781880684870
- Where River Meets Ocean. City Lights Books. 2003. ISBN 9781931404037
- With More Than Tongue. Creative Arts Book Company. 2003. ISBN 9780887395116
- The Other Side of the Postcard. City Lights Publishers. 2005. ISBN 9781931404068
- and then we became. City Lights Publishers. 2016. ISBN 9780872867260
- Califia's Daughter: Poems. Willow Books. 2020. ISBN 978-1733089890
