= Marcus Books =

Marcus Book
- Location within San Francisco County Location within California
- 37°49′45″N 122°16′06″W
- Location: 3900 Martin Luther King Jr Way, Oakland, California, U.S.

History
- Founded: 1960

San Francisco Designated Landmark
- Designated: February 13, 2014
- Reference no.: 266

Marcus Books (formerly "Success Printing" and "Success Books"), was founded in 1960, and is the oldest bookstore that specializes in African-American literature, history, and culture in the United States. For many years, it has been located in the Western Addition neighborhood of San Francisco, with a second location in Oakland, California. The store has remained independent and family-owned since its founding, and it is considered a community space for African-American and literary culture in the San Francisco Bay Area.

The former bookstore building, located at 1712–1716 Fillmore Street has been listed as a San Francisco Designated Landmark, since 2013.

== Pre-history ==
Julian Richardson was born April 4, 1916, in Birmingham, Alabama, as the youngest of eight children. Raye Richardson was born around 1921/1922.

The couple met at Tuskegee University, where they were both students. Richardson studied lithography in school, and he was a classmate of Ralph Ellison. The school provided a fertile intellectual environment for many African-American scholars, and George Washington Carver and Booker T. Washington taught there. Around 1940, Julian and Raye were married. Julian served in the United States Army, which " ...he hated, dearly. He wanted to do something for his people, so did my mom," according to Blanche Richardson, their daughter.

In 1946, Julian and Raye moved to San Francisco. Julian held many jobs as a printer, including working at the San Francisco Chronicle.

== History ==
=== Founding and early years ===
Julian Richardson eventually opened his own company, Success Printing. Julian and Raye were budding community activists. They decided to open a bookstore because Raye held a deep passion for books about African-Americans. The couple had a large book collection, and they often lent books to friends, so Julian decided to open a bookstore in the back of his print shop. As explained by Raye, "There was an urgent need to have a source of knowledge about black people."

As explained by Blanche Richardson in a 2008 interview:

"They shared a love of reading Black books and found them difficult to find and purchase. They realized that for a Black community to be progressive, it must have its own bookstore as a source of information about itself."

The store was located in the Western Addition neighborhood. The area had formerly been a Japanese-American neighborhood, but many homes had been vacated during the Japanese internment in World War II. As a result, African-American families began to move into the neighborhood, after previously facing housing discrimination from white landlords in other parts of the city. By the post-WWII era, the Western Addition, also known as the Fillmore district, was a thriving hub for African-American culture in the West Coast of the United States. The area was often called "Harlem of the West," and it was renowned for its jazz clubs.

Eventually, the bookstore was renamed Marcus Books, in commemoration of Marcus Garvey. The inspiration behind the name occurred after the Richardsons read The Philosophy & Opinions of Marcus Garvey, or Africa for the Africans. Additionally, both the fathers of Julian and Raye had been followers of Garvey. Over the years, the store needed to relocate multiple times, as the neighborhood experienced large-scale redevelopment.

In 1981, the bookstore moved to 1712 Fillmore Street, where it occupied a historic Victorian building for over three decades. The location had previously been the site of Jimbo's Bop City, a jazz club that attracted Miles Davis, Charlie Parker, Dizzy Gillespie and others. The store became an important community space. However, the owners struggled with racism and lack of mainstream support. The Johnsons said that they and their staff often dealt with "white-only-water-fountain-level racism."

Furthermore, in the 1960s and 1970s, black bookstores were spied on by the Federal Bureau of Investigation (FBI). For example, in October 1968, J. Edgar Hoover wrote in a memo about the “increase in the establishment of black extremist bookstores which represent propaganda outlets for revolutionary and hate publications and culture centers for extremism.” The memo asked for FBI agents to identify "black extremist and/or African-type bookstores" and open investigations into them.

=== 1970s–2000 ===
In 1976, Marcus Books opened a second store in Oakland, located at 3900 Martin Luther King, Jr. Way. As explained by Blanche Richardson:

"When the San Francisco Redevelopment Agency began "redeveloping" Blacks out of San Francisco, devastating the self-contained and vibrant Fillmore District, many Black families moved to the East Bay and my parents opened a second store in Oakland in 1976."

Over time, the Richardsons grew older. Raye received her Doctorate in Literature from University of California, Berkeley. She became the chair of the Black Studies department at San Francisco State University. Julian died in 2000, and Raye continued to operate the store alone. Eventually, the Johnson family (Karen Johnson, Gregory Johnson, and Tamiko Johnson) became owners of the store.

=== The 21st century ===
In the early twenty-first century, Marcus Books began to face financial difficulties. The growth of competitors, such as Barnes & Nobles, Borders, and Amazon, brought a 60% drop in sales between 2004 and 2010. However, the largest challenge to Marcus Books came in 2006, when the Johnsons took out a $950,000 predatory loan with monthly fixed interest payments. The loan had a 10% interest rate. Over time, monthly payments for the building rose to $10,000 per month. The Johnson family contacted the office of Kamala Harris to investigate the issue. In addition, the Johnsons launched a GoFundMe campaign with a $1,000,000 fundraising goal. There was public outcry over its prospective closure in the Bay Area. However, efforts to save the store were unsuccessful. The online fundraising campaign only raised $20,000, and the family was unable to pay the creditors before deadline.

The building was sold to the Sweis family, real estate investors and owners of Royal Cab, through bankruptcy court for $1.59 million. Westside Community Services offered to pay the Sweis family $1.64 million, so that it could become Marcus Books again. However, the Sweis family refused to sell the building for under $3.2 million, and they ordered a judge to evict Marcus Books. In April 2014, the bookstore was evicted due to failure to pay rent. London Breed, a San Francisco Supervisor at the time (later, San Francisco Mayor) said, "I wish I could come up with the money to buy it myself. But unfortunately, it's a capitalist society, and it doesn't work like that." Breed had often visited the bookstore as a child.

In 2016, it was announced that Marcus Books would open a branch in San Francisco, where they would occupy a space at the African American Art & Culture Complex (AAACC) on Fulton Street. While the space would be one-sixth of the previous San Francisco store location, the store would become part of the AAACC cultural community. The AAACC space hosts other African-American organizations, such as the African American Shakespeare Company and the San Francisco Juneteenth Festival, and it holds a large theater and conference rooms.

In total, the store has moved seven times in San Francisco, and twice in Oakland.

During the coronavirus pandemic in 2020, Marcus Books needed to temporarily close due to social distancing restrictions. The store launched an online fundraising campaign on GoFundMe with an initial $50,000 target which was later extended to a $200,000 goal. By early June 2020, the fundraising campaign had exceeded its goal.

== Community role ==
Since its founding, Marcus Books has sold a range of books, including children's books, educational books, and Afrocentric literature. They have also republished books that had been previously out of print, including The Philosophy and Opinions of Marcus Garvey and Stolen Legacy by George G.M. James. The bookstore was used as a meeting space for activists, before and after protests and rallies of the civil rights movement, as well.

Many notable African-American figures have patronized the store or hosted readings, including Malcolm X, Toni Morrison, Maya Angelou, Oprah Winfrey, Terry McMillan, Walter Mosley, Muhammad Ali, Ishmael Reed, Cornel West, Michael Eric Dyson, Chaka Khan, Queen Latifah, Kareem Abdul Jabbar, Randall Robinson, Nikki Giovanni, E. Lynn Harris, and others. In 2010, the bookstore had 6000 books in stock.
