= Terry Francois =

American lawyer and politician

Terry A. Francois
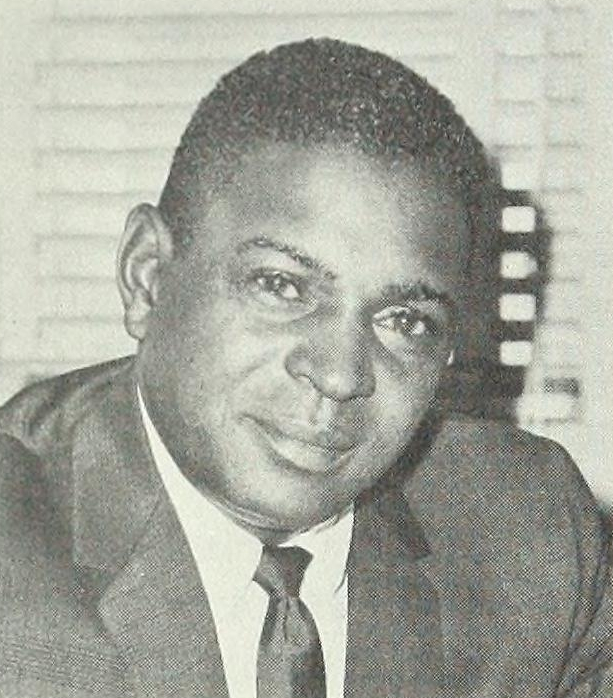
- Francois c. 1965

Member of the San Francisco Board of Supervisors from the at-large district
- In office September 1, 1964 – January 8, 1978
- Appointed by: John F. Shelley

Personal details
- Born: c. 1922 New Orleans, Louisiana, U.S.
- Died: June 9, 1989 (aged 66–67) San Francisco, California, U.S.
- Party: Democratic (until 1988); Republican (1988–1989)
- Spouse: Marion Le Blanc (m. 1947)
- Children: 5
- Education: Xavier University (BA); Atlanta University (MBA); University of California, Hastings (JD)
- Occupation: Attorney; politician; civil rights activist

Military service
- Allegiance: United States
- Branch/service: United States Marine Corps
- Years of service: World War II
- Rank: Platoon Sergeant

Terry A. Francois (c. 1922 – June 9, 1989) was an African American attorney, civil rights activist, and politician. He served as the San Francisco chapter president of the National Association for the Advancement of Colored People and became the first African American to serve on the San Francisco Board of Supervisors.

== Biography ==
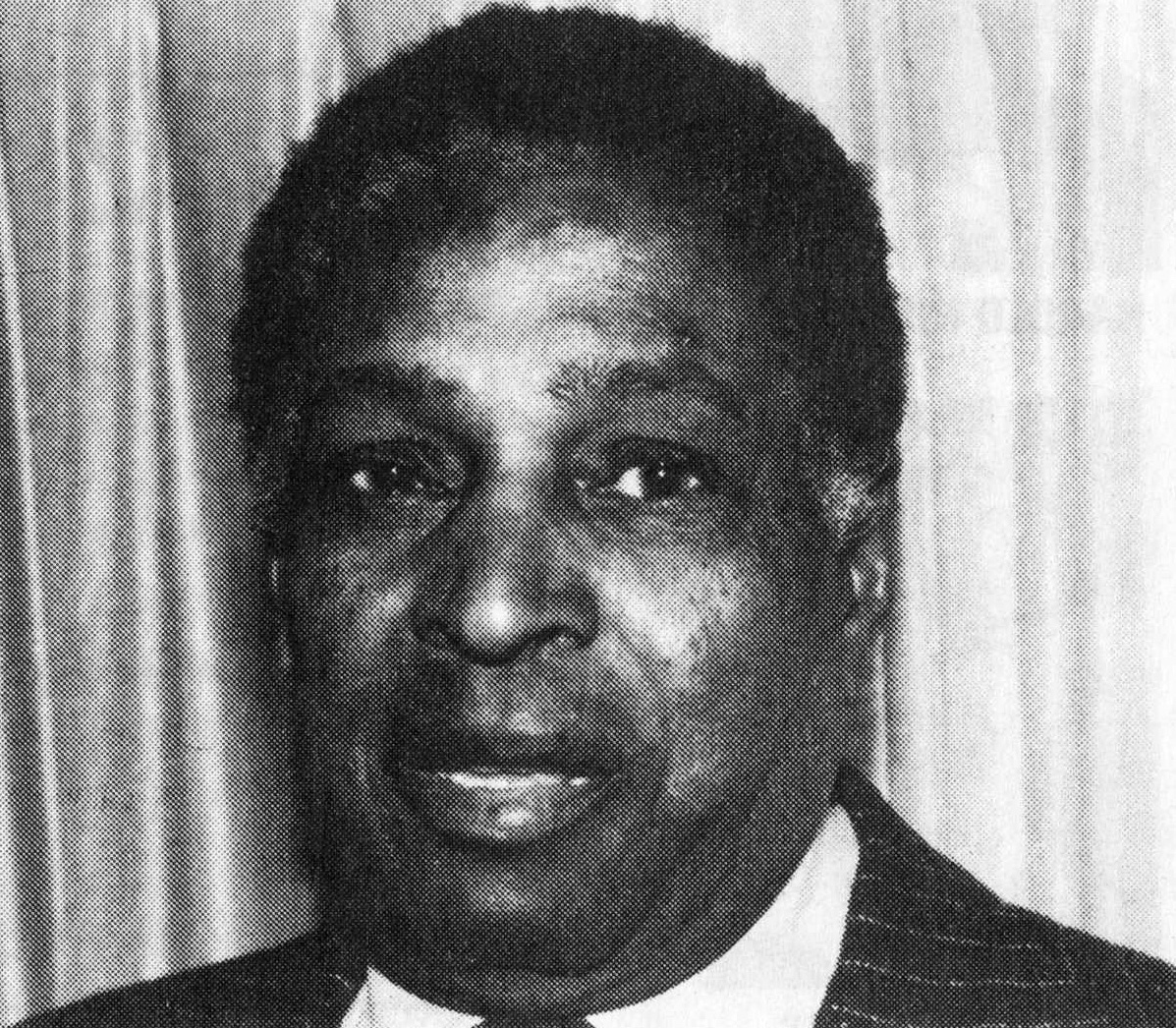
Francois c. 1988

Born in New Orleans, Francois obtained his bachelor's degree from Xavier University in 1940. He attended Atlanta University, where he earned a master's degree in business. Francois joined the United States Marine Corps, serving as a platoon sergeant in World War II. After the war, Francois moved to San Francisco, where he attended the University of California, Hastings College of the Law and received his law degree in 1949.

Francois protested unfair practices against Blacks in housing. He was elected as the San Francisco chapter president of the National Association for the Advancement of Colored People. He also served on the board of the San Francisco Urban League. In private practice, Francois represented Margherite Mays, the wife of Willie Mays.

Francois was named to the San Francisco Board of Supervisors in 1964 by Mayor John Shelley, becoming the first African American to serve on the Board. He was elected to his own term in 1967, and re-elected in 1971 and 1975. After San Francisco transitioned to supervisor elections based on districts, rather than at-large elections, Francois resigned his supervisor post in 1978 to return to private practice.

In 1988, he left the Democratic Party, registering with the Republican Party and endorsing George H. W. Bush in the 1988 United States presidential election.

He died of cancer on June 9, 1989, at the age of 67.

== Personal life ==
Francois married Marion Le Blanc in 1947. With his wife, Francois had five children: four sons and a daughter. He had eight grandchildren.

He was Catholic, and helped to lead the Catholic Interracial Council in San Francisco before its demise.

== Criticism ==
Following the end of the Civil Rights Movement and the rise of the Black Panthers, Francois was often criticized for his more lax approach to social issues, especially those affecting the Black community. He was seen by some as more of a White-oriented talking head than a figure fighting forcefully for Black causes.

== Legacy ==
Terry A. Francois Boulevard in San Francisco's Mission Bay neighborhood is named after him.
