= African Americans in the East Bay (San Francisco Bay Area) =

The East Bay within the San Francisco Bay Area has historically had a significant Black population, in comparison to the other counties and cities nearby. Culture of the area has been shaped by the Black population. Most notably the 1960s formation of the Black Panther Party happened in city of Oakland, which also served as the headquarters.

The two counties that comprise the East Bay Area, Alameda and Contra Costa, are estimated at 11% and 10% Black, respectively. The largest city in the East Bay, Oakland, is estimated at 22% Black in 2022.

== African Americans in Oakland, California ==
=== Migration and demographics ===
In 1940, 3% of the population of Oakland was Black, which grew to 12% in 1950, 23% in 1960, 34.5% in 1970. African Americans arrived in Oakland en masse between 1940 and 1970 (which is called the Second Great Migration), as they left the American South where segregationalist Jim Crow laws were in effect. Local jobs in the East Bay, particularly in the World War II era, such as shipyard work and railroad work offered Black Americans middle class wages.

In 1980, Oakland, California had a 47% Black population (the 20th-century peak number); and by the 2010 census, Oakland had a 27% Black population due to out of state migration and an influx of Chinese, Mexican, and Filipino immigrants.

=== Oakland, California culture ===
In 1858, the congregation of the First African Methodist Episcopal Church of Oakland was founded, it was the first Black church in the city, and it was home to the first Black school in the city led by founding member and teacher Elizabeth Scott Flood.

In 1867, the Brooklyn Colored School was opened by teacher Mary J. Sanderson (later Mary J. Sanderson–Grases) from Sacramento, offering early public school education to African American students in what was Brooklyn, California. The school was closed when the city of Brooklyn was annexed as part of Oakland in 1872.

In 1904, the North Oakland Missionary Baptist Church was founded by Rev. James A. Dennis on Myrtle Street in Oakland (now located in Emeryville, California). It is considered one of two pioneering Baptist Black churches in the area, the other being Beth Eden Baptist Church founded in 1890 in Oakland.

Oakland is home to Black rights organizations, such as the Black Panther Party (1966–1982). Students Huey Newton and Bobby Seale founded the Black Panther Party in 1966 at Merritt College (then located at a former high school on Grove Street, now occupied by Children's Hospital Oakland Research Institute), which emphasized Black nationalism, advocated armed self-defense against police, and was involved in several incidents that ended in the deaths of police officers and other Black Panther members. Among their social programs were feeding children and providing other services to the needy.

From 1968 until 1979 the Bayviewer (Lennie's Bayviewer) magazine was published, a political and social magazine focused on the African American community in the San Francisco Bay Area. Bayviewer magazine collection can be found at Oakland Public Library in the African American Museum and Library at Oakland.

Marcus Books was founded in 1960 in the Fillmore District of San Francisco as one of the country's first Black bookstores and oldest African American bookstore in the United States. It closed its San Francisco location in 2014 (with plans to return), and has a second location at 3900 Martin Luther King Jr. Way in Oakland.

Many Black celebrities grew up in Oakland, such as NFL player Marshawn Lynch, and rapper MC Hammer. Vice President Kamala Harris was born and raised in Oakland.

== African Americans in Piedmont, California ==
In January 1924, the city's first African-American homeowners, Sidney and Irene Dearing, got around the racially restrictive covenants by purchasing a home using a white family member as a proxy. The family was subject to racism and hate crimes after the purchase, and in May 1924 a mob of some 500 people came to their home and tried to force them to leave with threats of violence. The family eventually sold their home to the city shortly thereafter.

The city of Piedmont has a park named the Dearing Park, and started the Sidney and Irene Dearing Memorial Project in 2022 to honor the family. In 2026, the descendants of the Dearing family filed a lawsuit against the city.

== African Americans in Russell City, California ==
Russell City (also known as Russell) was an unincorporated community in Alameda County, California; which existed from 1853 until 1964, when the last of the residents were forced out to make way for an industrial park. During World War II, it was home to many African Americans and Latinos from Mexico and Puerto Rico, some braceros and other shipyard workers at Todd Shipyards and Kaiser Shipyards in Richmond.

== Social issues and violence ==
The BART Police shooting of Oscar Grant, an unarmed 22-year-old Black man, occurred in 2009; this led to many protests and riots in Oakland and in the Bay Area, and a court settlement between the Grant family and BART.

== Notable people ==
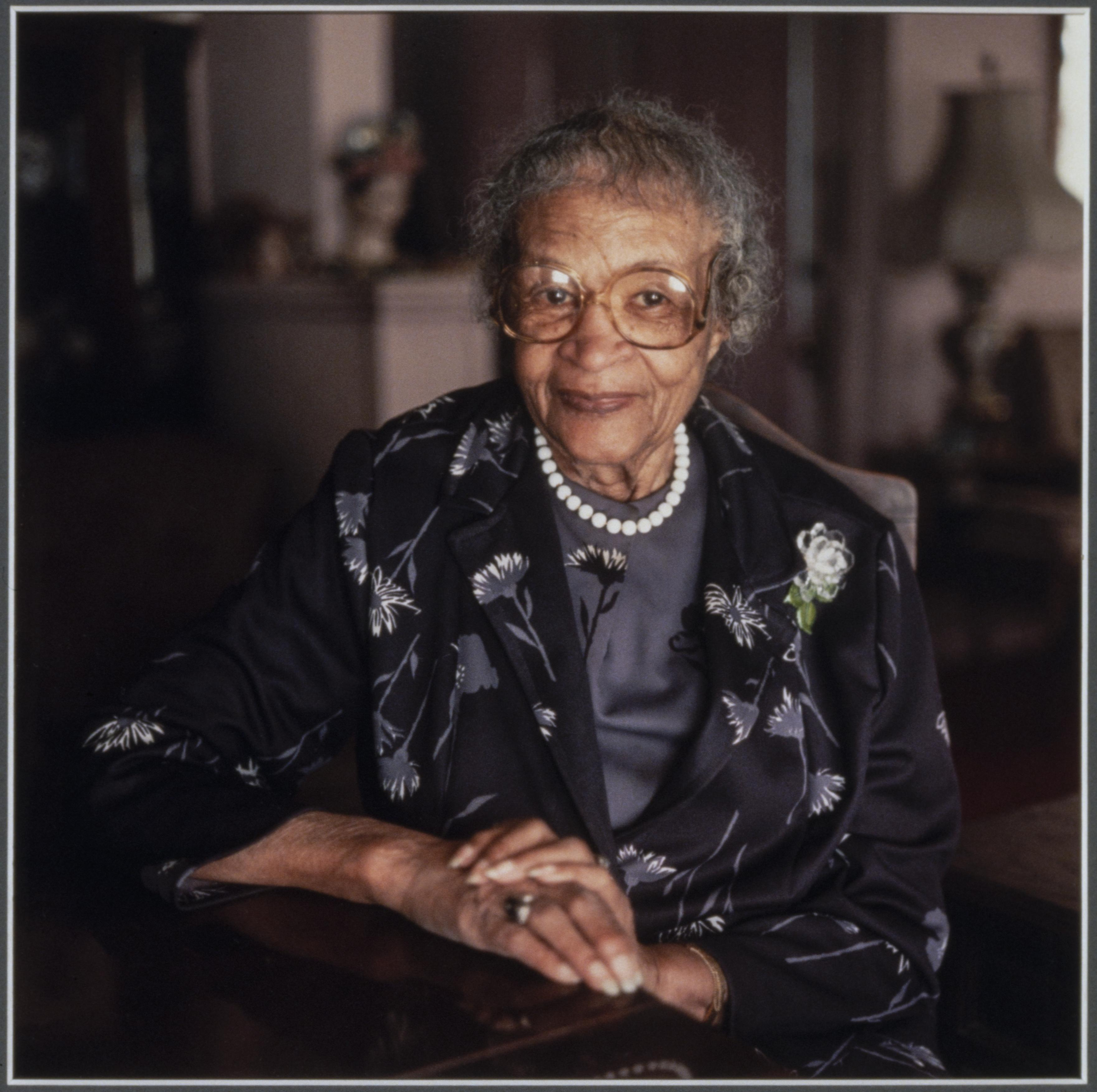
Frances Mary Albrier (1898–1987) civil rights activist and community leader

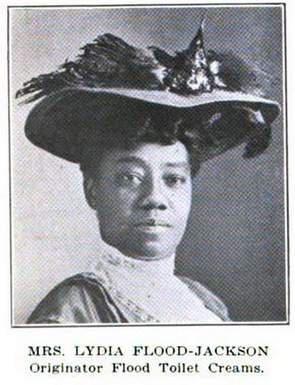
Lydia Flood Jackson (1862–1963) businesswoman, suffragist and clubwoman

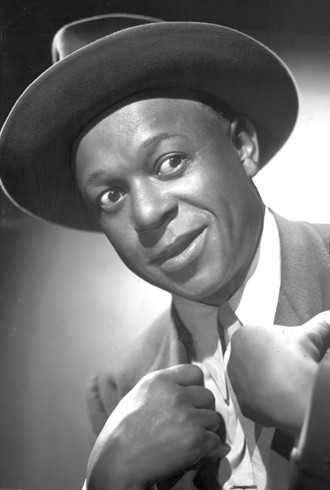
Eddie "Rochester" Anderson (1905–1977) actor and comedian

=== Activists and community leaders ===
- Frances Albrier (1898–1987) civil rights activist and community leader
- Yusuf Bey (1935–2003) Black Muslim activist and leader, criminal
- Elaine Brown (born 1943) prison activist, writer, singer, and former Black Panther Party chairwoman
- Angela Davis (born 1944) academic and political activist
- C. L. Dellums (1900–1989) labor activist
- Bobby Hutton (1950–1968) first recruit to join the Black Panther Party
- Brad Lomax (1950–1984) civil rights and disability rights activist
- Huey P. Newton (1942–1989) activist, founder of the Black Panther Party
- Tarea Hall Pittman (1903–1991) civil rights leader
- Bobby Seale (born 1936) activist, founder of the Black Panther Party
- Fannie Franklin Wall (c. 1860–1944) clubwoman, civic leader, community activist, and children's home founder
- Mother Wright (1921–2009) humanitarian activist, who fed the local homeless population

=== Businesspeople ===
- Alvin Aaron Coffey Sr. (1822–1902) pioneer, homesteader, laundry operator, miner, and farmer in California; who was formerly enslaved
- Lydia Flood Jackson (1862–1963) businesswoman, suffragist and clubwoman
- Harold Jenkins (1890–1967) nightclub owner
- Mary Ellen Pleasant (1815–1904) entrepreneur, financier, real estate magnate and abolitionist; moved to Oakland in 1889
- William T. Shorey (1859–1919) whaling ship captain

=== Educators ===
- Elizabeth Scott Flood (c. 1828–1867) 19th-century educator and activist
- Marcus Foster (1923–1973) educator, murdered by the Symbionese Liberation Army
- Ida Louise Jackson (1902–1996) educator and philanthropist
- Ruth B. Love (1932–2022) educator, education administrator and former public schools superintendent

=== Entertainers and actors ===
- Mahershala Ali (born 1974) actor
- Eddie "Rochester" Anderson (1905–1977) actor and comedian
- Renel Brooks-Moon (born 1958) former radio personality
- Elmer Keeton (1882–1947) musician, chorus director, teacher, community leader
- Zendaya (born 1996) actress

=== Journalists, poets, and writers ===
- Delilah Beasley (1867–1934) historian and newspaper columnist
- Belva Davis (born 1932) television and radio journalist
- Robert C. Maynard (1937–1993) journalist, newspaper publisher, and editor; former owner of The Oakland Tribune
- Ishmael Reed (born 1938) poet, novelist, essayist, songwriter, and playwright

=== Musicians and bands ===
- Mac Dre (1970–2004) rapper
- Dru Down (born 1971) rapper
- MC Hammer (born 1962) rapper
- Edwin Hawkins (1943–2018) musician and singer
- Philthy Rich (born 1983) rapper
- Calvin Simmons (1950–1982) conductor; first African-American conductor of a major orchestra
- The Pointer Sisters, R&B vocal group
- Too Short (born 1966) rapper
- Zion I, hip hop duo

=== Politicians ===
- Ron Dellums (1935–2018) politician, former mayor of Oakland
- Elihu Harris (born 1947) politician, former mayor of Oakland
- Kamala Harris (born 1964) politician, lawyer, former Vice President of the United States
- Barbara Lee (born 1946) politician, the 52nd mayor of Oakland since 2025
- Washington J. Oglesby (1859–1902) lawyer and politician; said to be the first Black lawyer admitted to the bar by the State of California when he passed in 1896
- William Byron Rumford (1908–1986) politician, pharmacist; the first African American elected to a state public office in Northern California
- Lionel Wilson (1915–1998) politician, former mayor of Oakland

=== Sports ===
- Glenn Burke (1952–1995) baseball player
- Curt Flood (1938–1997) baseball player
- Jim Hines (1946–2023) sprinter
- Jack Johnson (1878–1946) boxer
- Demetrius "Hook" Mitchell (born 1968) streetball player
- Bill Russell (1934–2022) basketball player and coach
- Dave Stewart (born 1957) baseball player and executive
- Toni Stone (1921–1996) baseball player; first female in the Negro League
- Archie Franklin Williams (1915–1993) U.S. Air Force officer, athlete, and teacher; winner of the 400 meter run at the 1936 Summer Olympics

=== Visual artists and designers ===
- Pauline Powell Burns (1872–1912) painter and pianist
- Claude Clark (1915–2001) painter, printmaker
- Robert Colescott (1925–2009) painter
- Mary Lovelace O'Neal (born 1942) abstracted mixed-media painter and printmaker, educator
- Raymond Saunders (1934–2025) mixed-media painter
- Lisette Titre-Montgomery (born 1977) video game artist and designer, art director
- Morrie Turner (1923–2014) cartoonist; creator of the strip Wee Pals

=== Others ===
- Sidney Dearing (1870–1953) businessperson
- Lloyd Noel Ferguson (1918–2011) chemist
- Wiley Manuel (1927–1981) associate justice of the Supreme Court of California; first African American to serve on the high court
- Felix Mitchell (1954–1986) mobster, drug lord
- Obediah Summers (1844–1896) minister, Civil War veteran, chaplain
- Charles F. Tilghman Jr. (1897–1985) printer, publisher; owner of Tilghman Press

== See also ==
- African Americans in California
- African Americans in San Francisco
- African American Museum and Library at Oakland
- Home for Aged and Infirm Colored People of California
