= Jingletown =

- Neighborhood of Oakland
- Location within Oakland, California
- Coordinates: 37°46′21.4″N 122°13′56.1″W
- Country: United States
- State: California
- County: Alameda
- City: Oakland
- Neighborhood: Fruitvale
- Elevation: 49 ft (15 m)
- ZIP code: 94601
- Website: jingletown.org

Jingletown is a pocket arts community in Oakland, California, adjacent to the Oakland Estuary, and about two miles southeast of Lake Merritt. It is bounded by the Coast Guard Island Bridge and Fruitvale Bridges, which connect Oakland to the city of Alameda. It is part of the area called Fruitvale (formerly, Brays and Fruit Vale) in East Oakland. Many working artists live in converted lofts that are common in the area.

== History ==
Originally it was part of an area called San Antonio, Oakland, California. The settlement that became San Antonio began in 1851 when James Buskirk Larue bought land from Peralta, west of San Antonio Creek. The site was west of Clinton. Larue built a store and wharf, and a community grew up around them. The San Francisco and Oakland Railroad built a station at San Antonio. When the Central Pacific Railroad took over the line in 1870, the name changed to Brooklyn. When the Southern Pacific Railroad took over the line in 1883, the name changed to East Oakland.

Clinton and San Antonio joined in 1856 to form a new town called Brooklyn, named after a ship that brought Mormon settlers to California in 1846. Brooklyn joined with nearby Lynn to incorporate in 1870 under the name Brooklyn. In 1872, Brooklyn voters approved their city's annexation by Oakland.

The name Fruitvale (originally Fruit Vale) comes from the fruit orchards (largely apricot and cherry) that dominated the area in the late 19th century. After the 1906 earthquake, the onslaught of refugees from San Francisco caused a population boom, and the unincorporated neighborhood was annexed into the City of Oakland by 1909.

Jingletown's name originates from a habit of nearby mill workers, largely males of Azorean Portuguese background, who would jingle the coins from a week's work in their pockets as they walked to display their prosperity. In the late 1950s and 1960s many of the Portuguese families began moving out of Jingletown—and Chicano and Latino families, many displaced from West Oakland by urban renewal, began moving to Jingletown.

Jingletown was deeply involved in the Chicano Movement of the late 1960s and early 1970s. A Chicano Moratorium protest against the Vietnam War on July 26, 1970 was organized in Jingletown by Chicano radicals.

== Jingletown since 1974 ==
In 1974, Jingletown faced the dangers of urban renewal, and the community was almost destroyed. Jingletown was rezoned from industrial to residential in response to fears that the community would be displaced by a proposed Del Monte cannery expansion. Chicano, Black and Portuguese activists organized to stop the demolition of Jingletown, and advocated for the rezoning. As the '70s ended, Jingletown was going through tough times. The neighborhood became notorious for gangs and drug dealing, which increased in the 1980s and 90s with the crack epidemic and gang era. Today, Latinos still make up half of Jingletown's population but are in danger of displacement by gentrification. In 1998, the neighborhood began a massive redevelopment, becoming home to an award-winning affordable housing project that has helped to revitalize the community.

Jingletown is one of the fastest growing arts districts in the San Francisco Bay Area. An organization called the Jingletown Arts & Business Community (JABC) is the main representative of the art community.

== See also ==
- Fruitvale, Oakland, California
- San Antonio, Oakland, California
