= North Oakland =

North Oakland may refer to:

- North Oakland, California
- North Oakland, Pittsburgh, Pennsylvania
- North Oakland Missionary Baptist Church in Emeryville, California
