= James LaRue =

James LaRue may refer to:

- Jim LaRue, American football player and coach
- James LaRue (sound engineer), American sound engineer
- J. B. Larue (James Buskirk Larue), California businessman and politician
