= The Shrives =

English punk rock band

The Shrives (formerly "Matt Grocott & the Shrives") were an English punk rock band formed in Grantham, England, by Matt Grocott.

In 2014 the band toured the UK with SWMRS. SWMRS drummer Joey Armstrong went on to record drums for the band's first album, recorded that same year in Oakland, California, at Jingletown Recording Studios. Green Day's frontman, Billie Joe Armstrong produced the album and played bass in a few songs. After struggling to get the album released, the band finally self-released it in 2017 on CD and through Streaming services. The band have been featured on NME, Rock Sound and Kerrang!

== Band members ==
- Matt Grocott – Vocals and Guitar
- Josh Horsfall – Guitar and Backing Vocals
- Henry Claude – Bass Guitar and Backing Vocals
- Joe Michelson – Drums

== Past members ==
- Tom Shelton – Bass Guitar and Backing Vocals

== Discography ==
Studio albums

- Back in the Morrow (2017)

Singles

- "Money Maker" (2018)
