= Beth Eden Baptist Church (Oakland, California) =

African American Baptist church in Oakland, California (1890–present)

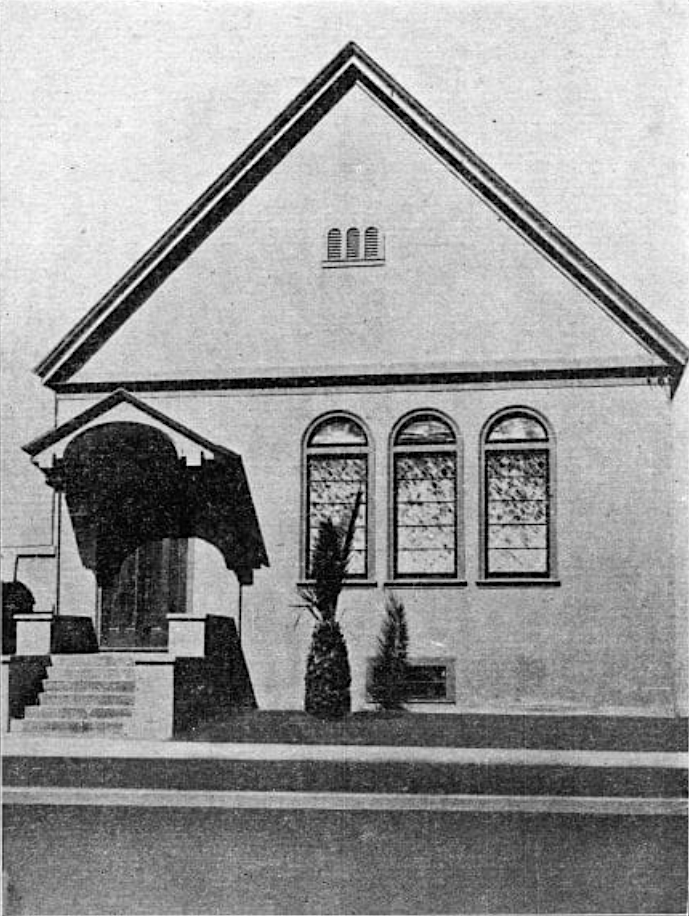
- Beth Eden Baptist Church (c. 1916) former building on Filbert Street in Oakland, California
- Beth Eden Baptist Church
- 37.806424°N 122.287487°W
- Address: 1183-10th Street, Oakland, California, U.S.
- Website: www.betheden.com

History
- Founded: April 20, 1890 (136 years ago)

Beth Eden Baptist Church is an American Baptist church founded in 1890, and located in Oakland, California. It is considered the oldest and one of two pioneering Baptist Black churches in the area, the other being the North Oakland Missionary Baptist Church in Emeryville. It has moved several times over the years, and is presently located at 1183 10th Street in Oakland.

== History ==
Beth Eden Baptist Church congregation was informally founded on February 17, 1889, in Oakland at the home of Sarah and Henry Homager. It was formally founded as a church on April 20, 1890, under Rev. George Gray. Rev. Gray was known for his southern style of preaching, which attracted some parishioners from the First African Methodist Episcopal Church (FAME) in Oakland. Rev. Gray left Beth Eden to found his own parish, Ebenezer Missionary Baptist Church (1890–1894) in Oakland. On October 15, 1891, Beth Eden Baptist Church incorporated in Alameda County, and became part of the Central Baptist Association which dramatically increased their membership. It has been sometimes known as "Mother Church" because multiple pastors have gone on to found their own parishes.

In 1899, the Beth Eden women parishioners founded the Fanny Jackson Coppin Club (also known as the Mother Club) which focused on fundraising, built music and literary programs, and performed service roles. In August 1925, Beth Eden moved to a building located at 10th Street at Magnolia Street. During the Great Depression, Beth Eden Baptist Church served as a feeding location and shelter, with the women parishioners leading the cause. They added two apartments to the upper portion of the church building in 1935, and added a clergy house on 14th Street. The Beth Eden Women's Mission Home was located on Adeline Street, for church members that needed housing.

In 1955, Rev. John Hubbard retired and was succeeded by Rev. Alvin Chester Dones, who was 63 years old at the time and some of the members of the pulpit thought he was too old to serve in the role, resulting in a filed lawsuit. Some of the disgruntled member of the church left Beth Eden to form the Church of the Good Shepard in North Oakland. During the period of Rev. Dones, the Beth Eden Housing Corporation was formed.

In 1982, a new church building was completed under the leadership of Rev. Gillette O. James, costing US $2 million. In the 1980s, a group of women from Beth Eden started a summer lunch program for youth, and contributed funds to a mission church in Antigua, West Indies.

In April 13, 2000, U.S. House of Representatives Barbara Lee honored Beth Eden during their 110th anniversary.

== Pastors ==
- Rev. George Gray, 1890
- Rev. Robert Alexander McQuinn, 1890 to 1894
- Rev. James L. Allen, 1895 to 1901
- Rev. John W. Dwelle, 1902
- Rev. John Charles Colyar, 1902 to 1903
- Rev. John Allen, 1903
- James Dennis, 1903 to 1904
- Francis T. Walker, 1904 to 1907
- Rev. Samuel W. Hawkins, 1907 to 1920
- Rev. John Hubbard, 1921 to 1955
- Rev. Alvin Chester Dones, 1956 to 1971
- Rev. Gillette O. James, 1971 to 2017
- Rev. Dwight Webster, 2017 to present

== See also ==
- African Americans in California
- African Americans in the East Bay (San Francisco Bay Area)
- Racial segregation of churches in the United States
