= Brooklyn Colored School =

School in California, US (1867–1872)

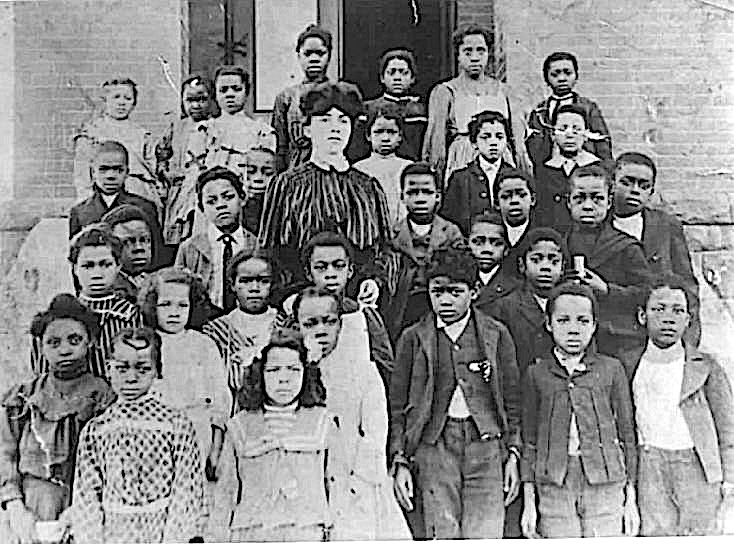
- Mary Jane Sanderson-Grases with her students, c. 1870

Location
- 1008 10th Avenue, Brooklyn, California (now Oakland, California), U.S. 37°47′25.5″N 122°15′9″W

Information
- Other name: Brooklyn School
- Established: 1867
- Closed: 1872

Brooklyn Colored School (1867–1872) was an early public elementary school for African American students founded in 1867 in Brooklyn, California (now Oakland, California).

== History ==
At the 1865 State Convention of the Colored Citizens of the State of California, there was a focus on changing laws related to educating African American students; and repeal a 1852 law that prevented African Americans children from attending public schools. It was decided that a separate Black school would be established if ten or more Black students lived in a surrounding neighborhood.

The Brooklyn Colored School was founded and led by teacher Mary J. Sanderson (later Mary J. Sanderson–Grases) from Sacramento, the daughter of Black abolitionist Jeremiah Burke Sanderson. Sanderson became the first Black public school teacher in Oakland. It was located in the "old Manning House" at 1008 10th Avenue in Brooklyn.

In 1872, the city of Brooklyn was annexed to the city of Oakland, and the school closed. After the closure, the city of Oakland approved integrating the Oakland school system shortly thereafter, but hiring Black teachers took longer.

== See also ==
- Phoenixonian Institute (1861–mid-1870s) in San Jose, California
- Elizabeth Scott Flood
- Ward v. Flood (1874)
