= John W. Dwinelle =

American lawyer and politician

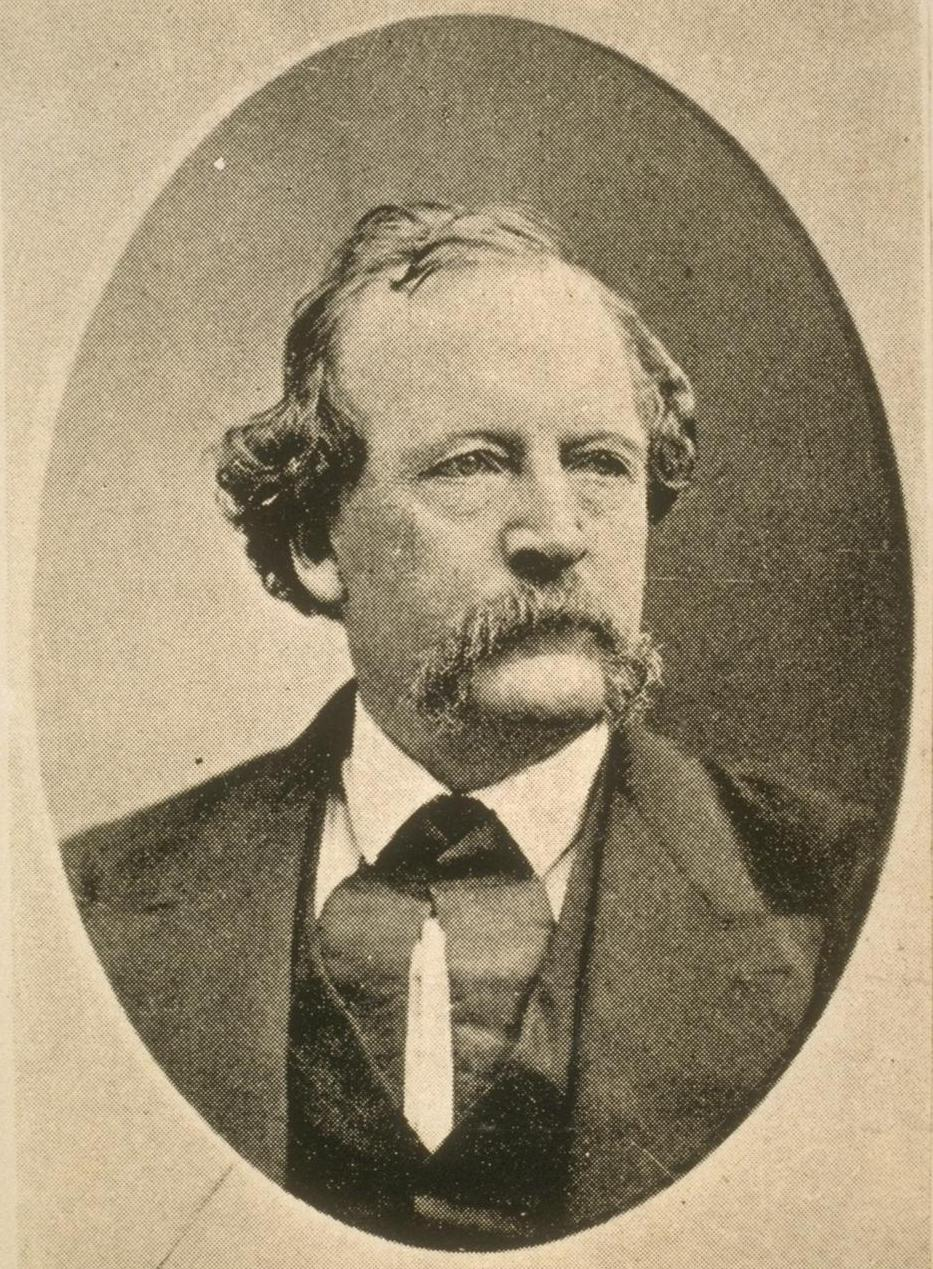
- John W. Dwinelle, date unknown
- Born: September 9, 1816; Cazenovia, New York
- Died: January 28, 1881 (aged 64); Port Costa, California

John Whipple Dwinelle (September 9, 1816 – January 28, 1881) was an American lawyer and politician. He served in a number of political posts in California and played important roles in both the legal history of San Francisco and the establishment of the California public university system.

Dwinelle was born in Cazenovia, New York, the son of Congressman Justin Dwinell and Louise Whipple, a descendant of William Whipple. He graduated from Hamilton College in 1834. While studying law, he edited the New York Daily Gazette, the Daily Buffalonian, and edited and typeset the Rochester Daily Advertiser. Dwinelle was admitted to the bar in October 1837 and began a legal practice in Rochester, New York. In 1844 he was elected city attorney of Rochester. The next year he became master of chancery.

In 1849, he sailed to San Francisco, California, and began a legal practice there. He served in a number of government offices, including two terms on the San Francisco city council, Mayor of Oakland, California, and member of the California State Assembly from Alameda County, California. He unsuccessfully advocated for the adoption of the civil law for the legal system of the newborn state; the state legislature and governor chose instead to adopt the common law by enacting a reception statute in April 1850.

Dwinelle represented the city of San Francisco in the so-called "pueblo case", Hart v. Burnett, which secured San Francisco's claim to four square leagues of land due to the city's establishment as the pueblo of Yerba Buena under Mexican rule. Dwinelle's lengthy brief on these matters of land usage and history was published as The Colonial History of San Francisco (1863).

Dwinelle was also the lawyer in an important court case regarding school segregation. In Ward v. Flood (1874), he represented a black child who was refused enrollment at a San Francisco school. The Supreme Court of California ruled that black students could not be refused education under the Fourteenth Amendment, but that they could be denied entry into specific schools on the basis of race. This upheld the legal principle of "separate but equal" many years before the legal doctrine was adopted by the United States Supreme Court in Plessy v. Ferguson (1896). While this ruling did not desegregate California schools, it did guarantee the right of black students to an education.

As an Assemblyman, Dwinelle wrote and introduced the 1868 Organic Act establishing the University of California. Dwinelle became one of the first Regents of the University of California. Dwinelle Hall at the University of California, Berkeley, the first campus opened as a result of Dwinelle's bill, is named for him.

Although Dwinelle represented both black and Chinese clients during his career, his progressive views on civil rights extended only to African Americans. In 1876, Dwinelle strongly denounced Chinese immigration in testimony before a joint special committee of Congress which was visiting California to investigate the matter. He argued that the Chinese were incapable of assimilation and had no interest in American institutions. In 1862, however, he had successfully represented Chinese clients in a civil action to challenge a "coolie tax" enacted by the state legislature.

While trying to catch a ferry, Dwinelle fell from a pier in Port Costa, California, and drowned. His body washed ashore three weeks later.
