= List of United States court cases involving the Fourteenth Amendment =

This is a list of fourteenth amendment cases that have been chosen under the Fourteenth Amendment to the United States Constitution.

Equal Protection Clause
Case name	Year	Citation	Decision
Ward v. Flood	1874	48 Cal. 36	upheld separate but equal schools in San Francisco
Plessy v. Ferguson	1896	163 U.S. 537	separate but equal for public facilities
United States v. Wong Kim Ark	1898	169 U.S. 649 (1898)	A child born in the United States to parents of foreign descent is a citizen of the United States unless
Cumming v. Richmond County Board of Education	1899	175 U.S. 528	de jure segregation of races
Lum v. Rice	1927	275 U.S. 78	separate schools for Chinese pupils from white schoolchildren
Roberto Alvarez v. Board of Trustees of the Lemon Grove School District	1931	66625 Cal. Super.	first successful school desegregation court decision in U.S. history
Powell v. Alabama	1932	287 U.S. 45	access to counsel
Missouri ex rel. Gaines v. Canada	1938	305 U.S. 337	states that provide a school to white students must provide in-state education to blacks
Smith v. Allwright	1944	321 U.S. 649	Race-based exclusion in political party primaries held unconstitutional
Hedgepeth and Williams v. Board of Education	1944	131 N.J.L. 153	NJ Supreme Court case that prohibited racial segregation in NJ schools
Mendez v. Westminster	1946	64 F. Supp. 544	prohibits segregating Mexican American children in California
Sipuel v. Board of Regents of Univ. of Okla.	1948	322 U.S. 631	access to taxpayer state funded law schools
Shelley v. Kraemer	1948	334 U.S. 1	restrictive covenants
Sweatt v. Painter	1950	339 U.S. 629	desegregated law schools in Texas
McLaurin v. Oklahoma State Regents	1950	339 U.S. 637	prohibited racially unfriendly practices within a state graduate program
Hernandez v. Texas	1954	347 U.S. 475	the 14th Amendment protects those beyond the racial classes of white or Negro
Briggs v. Elliott	1952	347 U.S. 483	Brown case 1 Summerton, South Carolina
Davis v. County School Board of Prince Edward County	1952	103 F. Supp. 337	Brown Case 2 - Prince Edward County, Virginia
Gebhart v. Belton	1952	33 Del. Ch. 144	Brown Case 2 - Claymont, Delaware
Bolling v. Sharpe	1954	347 U.S. 497	Brown companion case—dealt with the constitutionality of segregation in the District of Columbia
Browder v. Gayle	1956	142 F. Supp. 707	Montgomery, Alabama bus segregation is unconstitutional under the Fourteenth Amendment protections for equal treatment
NAACP v. Alabama	1958	357 U.S. 449	privacy of NAACP membership lists, and free association of members
Cooper v. Aaron	1958	358 U.S. 1	Federal court enforcement of desegregation
Boynton v. Virginia	1960	364 U.S. 454	Interstate commerce clause prohibits segregation at bus stop restaurant
Heart of Atlanta Motel v. United States	1964	379 U.S. 241	upheld the constitutionality of the Civil Rights Act of 1964
Loving v. Virginia	1967	388 U.S. 1	banned anti-miscegenation laws
Alexander v. Holmes County Board of Education	1969	396 U.S. 1218	changed Brown's requirement of desegregation "with all deliberate speed" to one of "desegregation now"
Swann v. Charlotte-Mecklenburg Board of Education	1971	402 U.S. 1	establish bussing as a solution
Guey Heung Lee v. Johnson	1971	404 U.S 1215	"Brown v. Board of Education was not written for blacks alone", desegregation of Asian schools in opposition to parents of Asian students
Milliken v. Bradley	1974	418 U.S. 717	rejected bussing across school district lines
Regents of the University of California v. Bakke	1978	438 U.S. 265	race could be considered among other factors in the college admissions process, but racial quotas under affirmative action are unconstitutional
Parents Involved in Community Schools v. Seattle School District No. 1	2007	551 U.S. 701	rejected using race as the sole determining factor for assigning students to schools
Obergefell v. Hodges	2015	556 U.S. 14	the United States Supreme Court ruled that marriage is a fundamental right guaranteed by the Fourteenth Amendment, and therefore must be afforded to same-sex couples. The ruling ensured that statewide bans on same-sex marriage could not be held up as constitutional.
Students for Fair Admissions v. Harvard	2023	600 U.S. 181	race-based affirmative action programs in college admissions are unconstitutional under the Fourteenth Amendment.
