= First African Methodist Episcopal Church (Oakland, California) =

African American Baptist church in Oakland, California (1858–present)

- FAME Church
- First African Methodist Episcopal Church
- 37.825935°N 122.265728°W
- Location: 3701 Telegraph Avenue, Oakland, California, United States
- Website: fameoakland.org

History
- Former name(s): Shiloh African Methodist Episcopal Church (1858–1884), Fifteenth Street Church (1884–1954)
- Founded: 1858; 168 years ago

First African Methodist Episcopal Church (FAME) of Oakland, California is the oldest Black church in the city, founded in 1858 and part of the African Methodist Episcopal (AME) Church. The church building experienced a major fire in 2023, and the building was demolished in 2025 with services continuing at other locations. It was formerly known as Shiloh AME Church, and as Fifteenth Street Church.

== History ==
First African Methodist Episcopal Church (FAME) was founded as the Shiloh A.M.E. congregation in 1858 in Oakland, California by local members of the Black community. The first church building was purchased in 1863, the former Carpenter School House.

The first school to teach Black students in Oakland was founded as a Black private school in 1858 by activist Elizabeth Scott Flood. Flood was a founding FAME church member, who also served as the first teacher at the school. The school was eventually given to FAME.

Rev. James Grisby, led the congregation in 1884 to acquire a larger building, where the name was changed from Shiloh A.M.E. Church to the Fifteenth Street Church. Under the leadership of Rev. Otho Eli Jones, the church building was remodeled in 1906, after the San Francisco earthquake. Rev. H. Solomon Hill, led the congregation in 1954, when the church was moved again and was renamed First African Methodist Episcopal Church.

The church building experienced a three-alarm fire in February 2023, and the building at 3701 Telegraph Avenue in Oakland was demolished in August 2025. The church has been fundraising in hopes of either rebuilding, or relocated nearby. Since 2024, they have held their services at North Oakland Missionary Baptist Church.

== Pastors ==
- Rev. John Lane, 1863–1874
- Rev. Jeremiah Burke Sanderson, 1874–1875
- Rev. James Grisby, 1884–1896
- Rev. J. Alen Viney, 1896–1900
- Rev. Otho Eli Jones, 1900–1910
- Rev. F. Jesse Peck, 1910–1915
- Rev. J.M. Brown, 1915–1922
- Rev. Nelson Pryor, 1922–1927
- Rev. T. Dean Scott, 1927–1932
- Rev. Daniel G. Hill, 1932–1943
- Rev. Pearl Bryant, 1943–1945
- Rev. Justus E. Roberts, 1945–1949
- Rev. Dr. H. Solomon Hill, 1949–1960
- Rev. J. Russell Brown, 1960–1971
- Rev. Edward S. Foust, 1971–1977
- Rev. George R. Reid, 1977–1981
- Rev. L. Fisher Hines, 1981–1986
- Rev. Dr. Frederick Ormonde Murph, 1986–1996
- Rev. Dr. Harold R. Mayberry, 1996–2020
- Rev. Dr. Rodney D. Smith, 2020–present

== See also ==
- African Americans in the East Bay (San Francisco Bay Area)
- Racial segregation of churches in the United States
- Bethel African Methodist Episcopal Church (San Francisco)
