= Elizabeth Scott Flood =

American educator and activist

Elizabeth Scott Flood (née Thorn; c. 1828–1867) was a 19th-century African American educator and activist in California. Flood was a "colored school" teacher in Sacramento, California and later fought for equal education rights for all children in Oakland, California.

== Early life and education ==
Elizabeth Thorn was born a freewoman in about 1828 in New York state. In New Bedford, Massachusetts, she received a good education, and married her first husband, Joseph Scott.

In 1852, now Elizabeth Thorn Scott, she moved to California with her husband Joseph and settled in Placerville. Joseph worked as a gold miner and died shortly after their arrival, leaving Scott alone to care for their son Oliver. Feeling that Placerville was not the adequate place for an African American widow and her young son, Scott and Oliver moved to Sacramento, which had a sizable African American population.

== Educator and activist ==
Arriving in Sacramento, Scott attempted to enroll Oliver in the local public school but was unable to do so since public schools there did not accept African American students, not by law, but by tradition. Thus, with the help of the local African Methodist Episcopal (AME) church, Saint Andrews African Methodist Episcopal Church, in May 1854, Elizabeth Thorn Scott opened, at her home, a small private school for African-American children on Second Street, between M and N Streets. It was the first private school for African-American children in Sacramento. In the small private school, Scott was the teacher and received a salary of $50 a month, which was paid by the parents of the students attending the school. Scott's school initially had only African American students, but before long, she began to take in Native American and Asian American students as well. At that school, students were not only children. They ranged in age from four, to twenty nine years old. A few months later, the Sacramento school board decided to take over administration of the school but did not provide funding, and arrangement that Scott accepted but without giving up her fight for equal rights for her students.

== Activism and education in Oakland, California ==
In 1855, Scott attended the first California State Convention of Colored Citizens in Sacramento. In that convention, African American activists from all backgrounds, strategized how to lobby California politicians for better representation and basic civil rights, such as the right to vote.

During that year, she met her second husband, Isaac Flood. Isaac was a freed slave who had been born in South Carolina and freed at the age of 22. Isaac was twelve years older than Elizabeth Scott and also had a son. The couple and their two children soon moved to Brooklyn, California, a thriving small community near Oakland. By 1857, Elizabeth Flood and her husband Isaac opened a school for African American children at their home on East 15th Street. At the time, African American children did not have access to public schools in Oakland. Because at that time there was not a large population of African American people in Oakland, Flood's son George Flood is claimed to be the first African American child born in Oakland.

By 1858, the Floods had three children, were involved in the community, and were one of the most prominent and progressive families in the area. That same year, they helped start the Shiloh African Methodist Episcopal (Shiloh AME) church, the first African Methodist Episcopal church in the area. In 1863, the church purchased an old 20 by 30 building and moved it to Second and Market Streets. The building had been an old school for white children that been abandoned. With that building, the Shiloh AME took over the school and used the building for church services as well as the school.

Flood continued to teach at the school until her death in 1867. The local school laws did not allow African American students into public schools until 1872, but in 1866, it opened up government funded schools for African American and other non-white children. The Shiloh AME school operated for ten years before closing its doors in 1873.

== Death and legacy ==
Flood died unexpectedly in 1867 at age 39. She left behind her husband Issac and five children, including Lydia Flood Jackson.

Although Flood never saw the desegregation of schools, in 1872 the city of Brooklyn began to accept African Americans in its schools, including at the Brooklyn Colored School, following a similar decision by the Oakland School Board. That same year, Brooklyn was annexed to Oakland. Flood's youngest daughter, Lydia Flood Jackson was one of the first African American students to attend Oakland schools in 1872. By 1875, all African American schools in the area were closed, and in 1880, the law was changed in the state of California proactively mandating the integration of schools.

== See also ==
- African Americans in California
- African-American history
- African American Women
- Civil rights movement (1865–1896)
- Phoenixonian Institute, the first African American high school in California
- Ward v. Flood, 1874 California Supreme Court case on racial segregation
