= Clinton, Oakland, California =

Neighborhood in Oakland, California, U.S.

Coordinates: 37°47′47″N 122°15′05″W

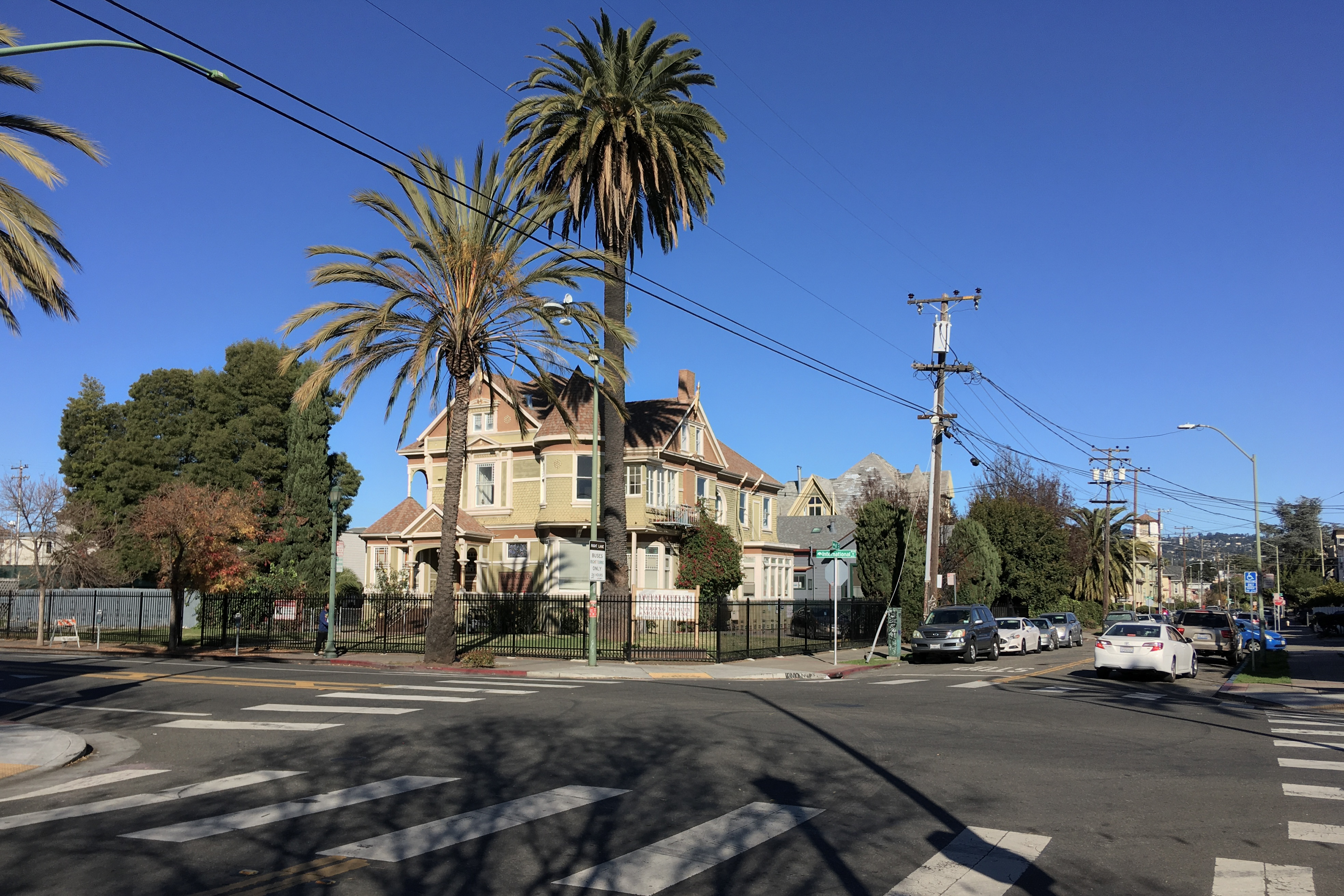
Clinton in 2024

Clinton is a neighborhood in Oakland, California, United States. It lies at an elevation of 36 feet (11 m).

Clinton started when brothers named Patten leased land on the east side of the San Antonio Slough from Vincent Peralta in 1850, and joined with others to found the town in 1852.

Clinton and San Antonio joined in 1856 to form a new town called Brooklyn, named after the ship that had brought Mormon settlers to California in 1846. Brooklyn joined with nearby Lynn to incorporate in 1870 under the name Brooklyn. In 1872, Brooklyn voters approved their city's annexation by the city of Oakland.

== Buildings and structures ==
- Ellen Kenna House, 1888
