= San Antonio, Oakland, California =

San Antonio
- Neighborhood of Oakland
- Location within Oakland
- Coordinates: 37.8009°N 122.240753°W
- Country: United States
- State: California
- County: Alameda
- City: Oakland

San Antonio is a large district in Oakland, California, encompassing the land east of Lake Merritt to Sausal Creek. It is one of the most diverse areas of the city. It takes its name from Rancho San Antonio, the name of the land as granted to Luís María Peralta by the last Spanish governor of California.

== History ==
The settlement that became San Antonio began in 1851 when J. B. Larue purchased Peralta's land west of San Antonio Creek. The site was west of Clinton. Larue built a store and wharf and the community grew up around them. The San Francisco and Oakland Railroad built a station at San Antonio. When the Central Pacific Railroad took over the line in 1870, the name was changed to Brooklyn. When the Southern Pacific Railroad took over the line in 1883, the name was changed to East Oakland.

Clinton and San Antonio joined in 1856 to form a new town called Brooklyn named after the ship that had brought Mormon settlers to California in 1846. Brooklyn joined with nearby Lynn to incorporate in 1870 under the name Brooklyn. In 1872, Brooklyn voters approved their city's annexation by Oakland.

== Neighborhoods ==
The district is made up of a number of smaller neighborhoods, each with its own distinct personality, history and demographics.

- Bella Vista
- Cleveland Heights
- Clinton
- East Peralta
- Eastlake/Merritt
- Highland Park
- Highland Terrace
- Ivy Hill
- Jingletown
- Lynn
- Meadow Brook
- Oak Tree
- Rancho San Antonio
- Reservoir Hill
- Tuxedo

=== Cleveland Heights ===
Cleveland Heights, also known as Haddon Hill by local realtors, is located at the northwestern corner of the San Antonio district, perched on a hill overlooking Lake Merritt. It was formerly the township of Brooklyn prior to its annexation by Oakland in 1909. The neighborhood is commonly known as the area encompassed by Lakeshore Avenue on Lake Merritt, East 18th Street, Park Boulevard, and MacArthur Boulevard/I-580 MacArthur Freeway. The neighborhood includes Oakland High School in the east corner of the neighborhood. It is commonly known as China Hill because of the large Chinese population that lives there.

=== Eastlake ===
The Eastlake district, formerly known as East Peralta, comprises the area along International Blvd. between 1st and 14th Avenues. It is currently the site of an ethnic enclave, housing many immigrants of southeast Asian origin. East 12th Street has a large Vietnamese American population, and has many Vietnamese restaurants and businesses, giving it the nickname Little Saigon, which the local Vietnamese Chamber of Commerce is working to elevate into a formal designation by the city and to promote through a Business Improvement District. There is a Vietnamese American Community Center located at International Boulevard. There are also sizable populations of Cambodian Americans and Laotian Americans.

=== Highland Park ===
Highland Park is the area immediately surrounding Highland Hospital, bounded by 13th Avenue on the west, 14th Avenue to the east, East 32nd Street to the north and East 24th Street to the south.

=== Funktown ===
Funktown's boundaries are east of 5th Avenue and west of 18th Avenue, south of East 28th Street and north of East 14th Street. The name Funktown derives from the name of a local gang Funktown USA that once occupied the area. The gang was a notorious rival of Felix Mitchell's 6-9 Mob as the two struggled for control over the East Oakland drug trade. As Funktown USA's membership dwindled in the late 1980s. East Oakland residents simply referred to the area as "Funktown".

=== Jingletown ===
The subsection of the neighborhood adjacent to the Oakland Estuary is called Jingletown. The name originated from long ago when there was a Portuguese community in the area and men would gather around on the street corners chatting amongst each other with their hands in their pockets jingling coins.

=== Lynn ===
Lynn was an early settlement, located northeast of Brooklyn. In 1870, Lynn and Brooklyn incorporated as Brooklyn In 1872, voters approved the annexation by Oakland. Lynn hosted a large shoe and boot factory, and was named after Lynn, Massachusetts which also had a large footwear industry.

=== The Murder Dubbs ===
"The Twomps" is a local name for the neighborhood between 20th and 29th Avenues. It is also known as "The Rolling '20s", "The Roaring '20s", or "Murder Dubbs", references to its history of drug trafficking and gang violence. The area was known as The Twomps in the 1980s, but became known as Murder Dubbs in the early 1990s due to a dramatic rise in drug-related violence.

The landmark avenue for the Twomps is 23rd Avenue, which also serves as the primary thoroughfare for which Twomps residents get to other main city boulevards. 23rd Avenue is heavily traveled on for its numerous stores, laundromats, and other neighborhood services.
