= Elmer Keeton =

American musician (1882–1947)

- Born: William Elmer Keeton; February 14, 1882; Rolla, Missouri, U.S.
- Died: January 1, 1947 (aged 64); Oakland, California, U.S.
- Other name: W. Elmer Keeton
- Education: Northwestern University (PhD)
- Occupations: Musician, composer, community leader, teacher, music director

William Elmer Keeton (February 14, 1882 – January 1, 1947), commonly known as Elmer Keeton, was an American musician, composer, community leader, teacher, and music director in Oakland, California. He was the founder of Keeton's Oakland Color Chorus, which was later known as Keeton Memorial Chorus.

== Life and career ==
William Elmer Keeton was born on February 14, 1882, in Rolla, Missouri; to black parents Elizabeth and Rev. Calvin M. Keeton. His father was the district supervisor for the Methodist Episcopal Church. Keeton attended Northwestern University in Evanston, Illinois, where he received a PhD in musicology.

He enlisted in the 9th Cavalry Regiment at Fort Sheridan, Illinois, and served as the bandmaster. After his discharge, Keeton settled in St. Louis and worked as an organist for the Berea Presbyterian Church and Saint's Protestant Episcopal Church.

He moved to California in 1921, settling in Oakland. Keeton was the musical director of the Northern California WPA Negro Chorus under the auspices of the Federal Music Project, from 1932 to 1940; and was the musical director of the Richmond Recreation Department in Richmond, California, from 1944 to 1946. During the 1939 Golden Gate International Exposition, Keeton directed The Swing Mikado, an adaption of Gilbert and Sullivan's The Mikado a comic opera with an all-black cast set in an unknown tropical island called "Coral Island".

== See also ==
- African Americans in the East Bay (San Francisco Bay Area)
