= Ward v. Flood =

1874 California Supreme Court case on racial segregation

- Supreme Court of California

Decided 1874
- Citation(s): Ward v. Flood, 48 Cal 49–52 (1874).

Holding
- The law providing for the education of children of African descent in separate schools at the public expense is not in conflict with the Constitution of California, nor in conflict with the Thirteenth and Fourteenth Amendments to the Constitution of the United States. When such a law exists, "colored" children may be excluded from schools established for white children, but only if schools for colored children have been established; otherwise, they cannot be excluded from schools for white pupils.

Case opinions
- Decision by: Chief Justice William T. Wallace
- Concurrence: Justice Elisha W. McKinstry

Ward v. Flood 48 Cal. 49–52 (1874) was the first school segregation case before the California Supreme Court, which established the principle of "separate but equal" schools in California law, 22 years before the United States Supreme Court decided Plessy v. Ferguson. Following Ward v. Flood, litigation over racial segregation in schools in California continued for over a century.

== Background ==
The ratification of the Fifteenth Amendment to the United States Constitution in 1870 meant that African American men in California finally had the right to vote. However, equal access to education remained a critical issue for communities throughout the state. Black newspapers such as the Pacific Appeal stated, "The proper education of our children is paramount to all other considerations." Although the earliest school laws in California did not specifically mention race, segregated schools existed as early as 1854.

In 1866, the California state legislature enacted a revised law requiring local districts to establish separate schools for children of African, Mongolian, or Indian descent, (Note: "Mongolian" referred at the time to Chinese immigrants and their children, while "Indian" referred to Native Americans.) if petitioned by ten or more parents or guardians of those children. Where such schools did not exist, children of color should be permitted to enroll in school with white children, unless the parent of a white child objected in writing. In practice, this meant that black children in rural areas often did not receive an elementary education. For many families, paying for private school was not an option. According to a professional teachers' organization, as of 1874, one in four black children did not attend school. Where separate schools existed, black children were relegated to second-rate school facilities, funded in part through additional taxes paid by black parents, and often had to walk long distances to school. According to The San Francisco Elevator newspaper, black schools were receiving only two-thirds of the annual appropriation paid per-student to white schools. Furthermore, The Elevator charged that no fewer than 20 counties had misappropriated public funds for colored schools and diverted them to white schools instead.

In April 1870, the California legislature passed a law requiring all children of African and American Indian descent to attend separate schools; local school districts could no longer admit them to white schools using their discretion. The African American community in California responded in anger, and mobilized to try to repeal the new law.

In November 1871, an education convention was held in Stockton, California, at the church of educator Jeremiah B. Sanderson. One of the resolutions they adopted was to petition the legislature to remove the words "children of African descent" from the law, so they could "be allowed educational facilities with other children." Following the convention, Senator Seldon J. Finney of San Mateo County took up the cause, and introduced a bill in the California legislature to end segregation of schools. The bill failed, and in 1872, African American leaders decided to pursue a test case in court.

In April 1872, African American leaders announced that they had selected San Francisco attorney and former state assemblyman John W. Dwinelle to represent the interests of the black community, after interviewing several candidates. In the summer of 1872, they organized meetings in San Francisco, Sacramento, Stockton, and Maryville, to raise money to pay for legal fees, and hired Dwinelle.

== Dispute ==
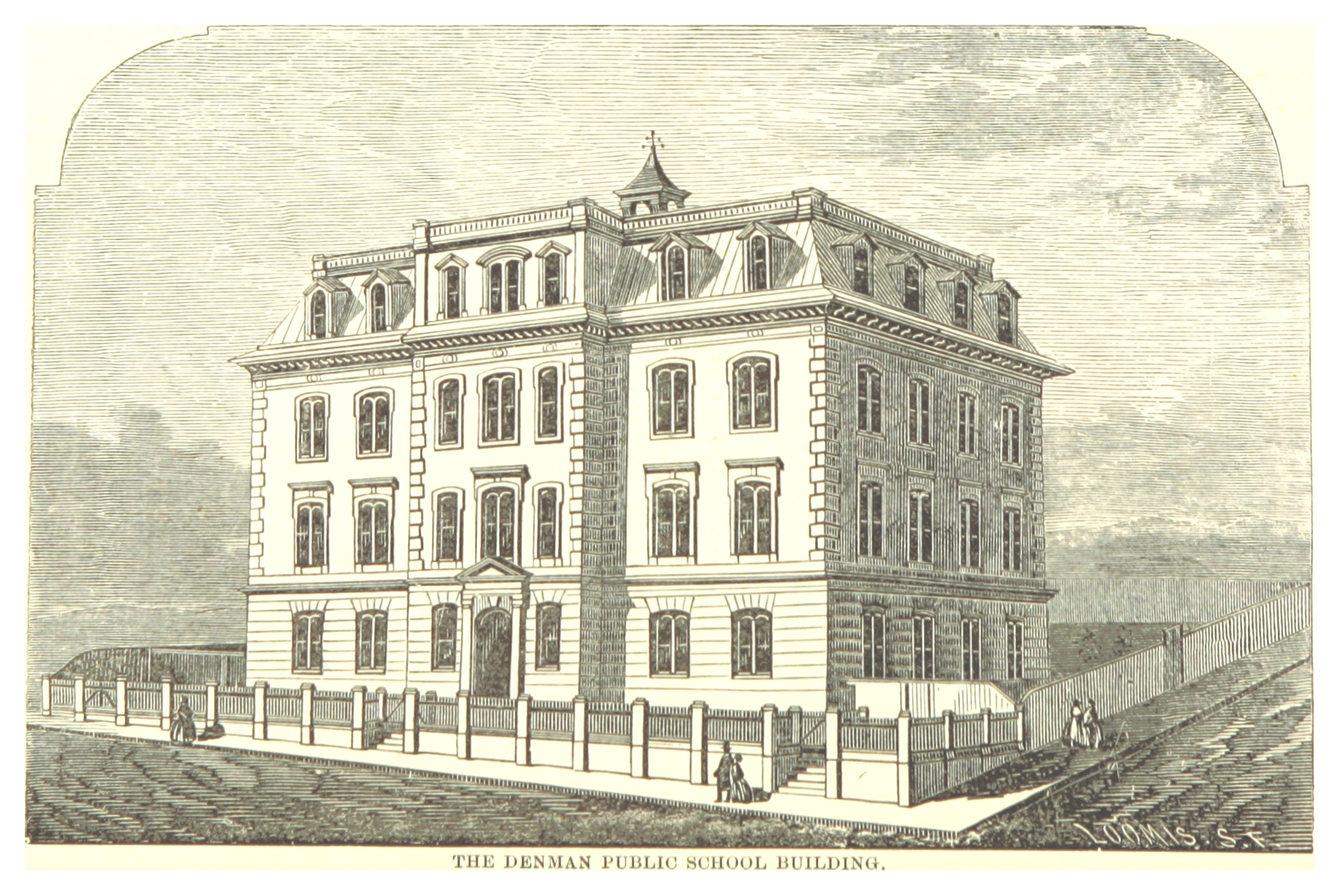
Denman public school building in San Francisco in the 1870s. In 1872, Mary Frances Ward was denied enrollment at another San Francisco school because of her race.

In 1872, San Francisco had two "colored schools" located at opposite ends of the city, one of which was a small room rented by the Board of Education. Meanwhile, according to The Appeal newspaper, white children had access to "43 or more splendidly built school houses in the city suited or adapted to every neighborhood".

On July 23, 1872, The San Francisco Chronicle reported that several African American parents had attempted to enroll their children in four different schools, but had been denied, and that John W. Dwinelle was planning legal proceedings to overturn these decisions.

One of those parents was Harriet Ward, who had tried to register her eleven-year-old daughter, Mary Frances, at Broadway Grammar School, a "regular" public school for white children in San Francisco, which was the closest to their home. Harriet and A. J. Ward had been residents of San Francisco since 1859. Principal Noah Flood refused to allow their daughter to enroll, advising Mrs. Ward that she should take Mary Frances to one of the "colored schools" as required by the San Francisco Board of Education, since she was black.

== Trial ==
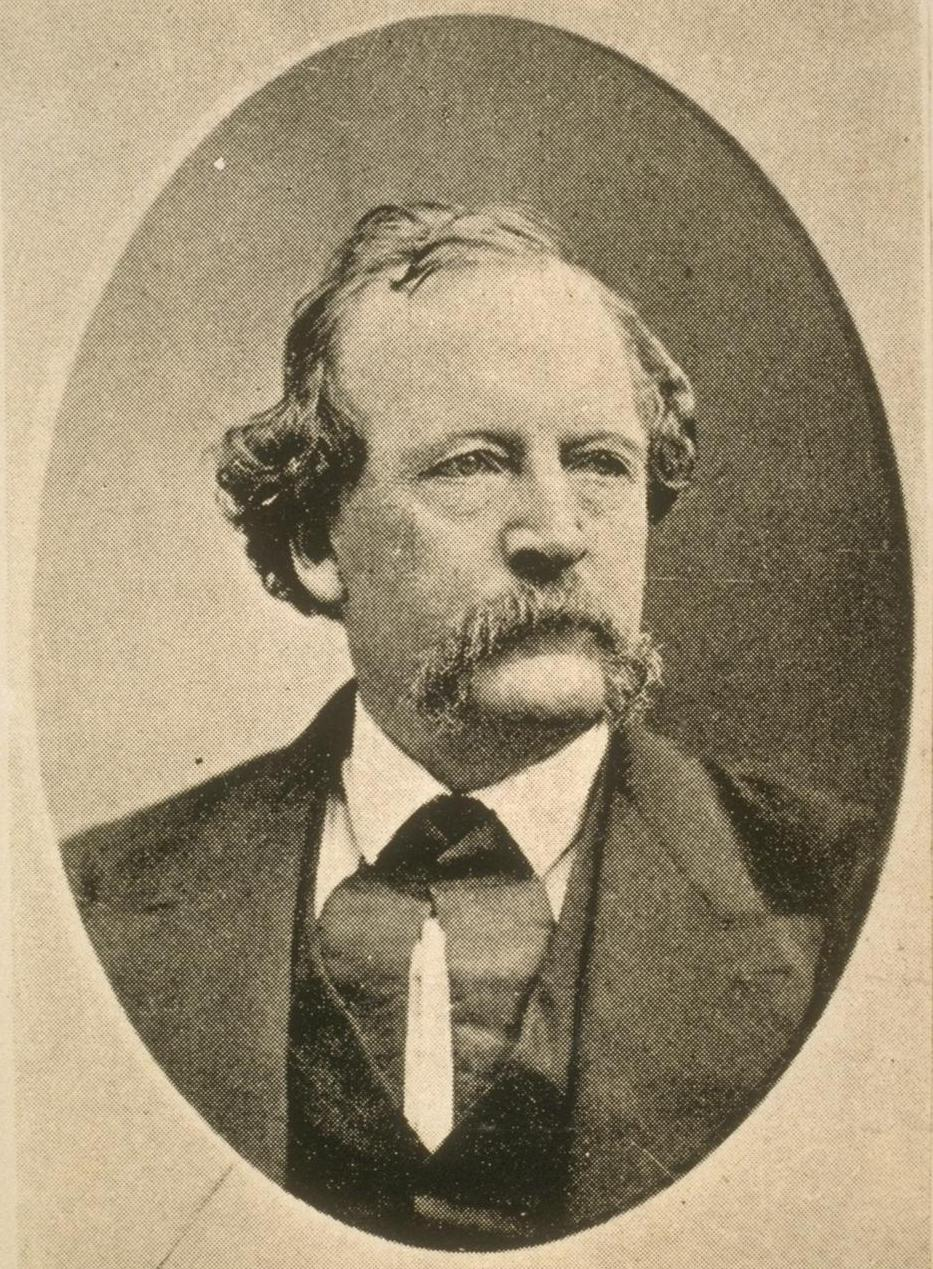
Attorney John W. Dwinelle represented Ward.

Dwinelle chose Mary Frances Ward as the plaintiff for the case, represented by A. J. Ward as her father and guardian. In September 1872, Dwinelle applied for a writ of mandate, requesting the California Supreme Court to order Flood to admit Mary Frances Ward to the school. He submitted a written affidavit from Harriet Ward stating that the only reason Noah Flood had denied their request to enroll her daughter was due to her race and the school board policy. Attorneys for the school board argued that the colored schools provided an equal education, and claimed that Mary Frances Ward had not completed the prerequisites to enter the lowest grade of the Broadway Grammar School.

On November 22, 1872, the Wards' attorney, John W. Dwinelle appealed to the California Supreme Court, arguing that the existing school code violated both the Fourteenth and Fifteenth Amendments, as well as the Civil Rights Act of 1866. One of his initial arguments, that the exclusion of Mary Frances Ward constituted a "badge of servitude" in violation of the Thirteenth Amendment, was rejected outright by the court, which noted that exclusion of a black child from a white school was not the same as forced slavery.

Dwinelle's main argument was based on the equal protection clause of the Fourteenth Amendment, which had been enacted in 1868. Echoing Charles Sumner's argument in Roberts v. City of Boston in 1850, Dwinelle contended that forcing black schoolchildren to attend separate schools marked them as "inferior" in the eyes of the rest of society, denying them equal protection under the law.

When the case reached the California high court, Harriet Ward stated in her petition on behalf of her family, "We are all of African descent...residents of San Francisco...[and] have a right to be received...at the school nearest their residence." Meanwhile, Noah Flood maintained that he had merely been following state law, and that the black school would provide Mary Frances with an education "equal" to the white school.

== Decision ==
Eighteen months later, the California Supreme Court ruled against Ward, citing both the Slaughter-House Cases and Roberts v. City of Boston as precedent. The majority opinion held that the privileges and immunities of the Fourteenth Amendment only applied to federal laws, while California public schools were run by the state and were therefore a privilege held through state citizenship rather than U.S. citizenship.

With regard to equal protection, the court ruled in Ward v. Flood that the state was not violating any law, as long as it provided similar educational opportunities to all its citizens. The California Supreme Court cited an 1849 ruling by the Supreme Judicial Court of Massachusetts that segregating schools by race was no different to separating students by age, gender, or special needs. Quoting from Roberts v. City of Boston, the court maintained that having separate schools was not the reason for the "odious caste distinctions" confronting black children.

At the same time, the California high court clearly affirmed that all children had a right to a publicly funded education, which had to be provided to them equally under state law. Further, the state supreme court ruled that excluding black children from white schools would not be allowed unless separate schools were available. If not, they had the right to attend white schools.

== Aftermath ==
In the wake of the Ward v. Flood decision, African Americans in San Francisco protested segregation in education, by boycotting black schools. Local districts also came under increased financial strain during the Long Depression, which started in 1873. Thus, although the California State Supreme Court had upheld segregation, in practice, most school districts in California opted to enroll black students rather than fund two separate school systems, including the Board of Education in San Francisco, which opened its white schools to black children in 1875. Furthermore, in communities where no separate school for black children existed, schools were now required to enroll black children. For many African American children living in rural California, it was their first opportunity to go to elementary school. Between 1875 and 1880, the absentee rate for black students dropped from 40 percent to 17 percent.

By 1880, the California State Legislature temporarily removed all references to race in the school code, but exclusion and segregation continued in some districts including San Francisco, particularly against families of Chinese immigrants. In 1885, the legislature made a further change to the school code, establishing "separate schools for 'children of Mongoloid or Chinese descent".

In 1896, when the Supreme Court of the United States ruled in Plessy v. Ferguson that racial segregation did not violate the United States Constitution, as long as "separate but equal" public facilities were available, it cited several state court decisions, including Ward v. Flood.

== See also ==
- List of United States court cases involving the Fourteenth Amendment
- Plessy v. Ferguson
- Mendez v. Westminster
