= Mother Wright =

American activist (1921–2009)

Mary Ann Wright (July 11, 1921 – May 7, 2009), known as Mother Wright, was a humanitarian activist who lived and worked in Oakland, California and fed East Bay residents for almost 3 decades. She fed more than 450 people a day on a budget of $137,000 a year. She also distributed huge quantities of food, clothing and toys each holiday season from her West Oakland warehouse. Wright held a very active schedule into her 80s, usually arriving at the foundation at 6 a.m. and would tirelessly continue to move boxes herself.

== Biography ==
She was born into an African-American family of Catholics in New Orleans and raised in the small town of Darlington, Louisiana. She grew up poor, lost her mother when she was only 5 years old, and was raised by her father. She was married at 14 years old and had her first child at 15. In 1950 she fled an abusive husband and took her nine children and moved to California. As a single mother, she worked long hours picking cotton, walnuts and strawberries in Hayward, Walnut Creek, and around the state. For another stretch of time she worked two jobs to make ends meet as a domestic helper during the daytime shift and in a San Leandro cannery during nights. She later remarried and had three more children, one of which was adopted.

In 1980 she says she was awakened by God in her sleep when she received a vision in a dream who told her to feed the hungry. "The Lord woke me up in the middle of the night and told me what he wanted me to do, which was feed the hungry," she said. She started out feeding the poor and homeless by serving one meal a week, on Saturdays, downtown at Jefferson Park in Oakland, supported by her $236 Social Security check. With help from others, among them grocers, produce merchants, the leaders of local churches and community groups, and city officials, this effort grew to become the Mother Mary Ann Wright Foundation. Through the Mary Ann Wright Foundation, Wright, family members and numerous volunteers regularly collected food and clothing from various local businesses (i.e. Safeway) and other donors to distribute to the needy. The foundation's warehouse on San Pablo Avenue at 32nd Street has been her main distribution center. At the holidays, long lines always formed outside with Wright often on the sidewalk, bullhorn in hand, leading a prayer as people picked up bags of boxed and canned food, toys and Christmas trees.

As well as helping people in Oakland, her foundation has provided help to people in Russia and Vietnam, and founded a school in Kenya. Mother Wright, accepted no pay and was assisted primarily by her daughters.

In 2005, Wright was inducted into the Hall of Fame for Caring Americans, by the Caring Institute. She met Bill Cosby and Aretha Franklin, and was invited to more than one presidential inauguration.

Wright, who had been struggling with heart trouble for several years, died at age 87 in Alta Bates Summit Medical Center in Berkeley. She was survived by 10 children, 33 grandchildren and 37 great-grandchildren, and preceded in death by two sons.
