= Lydia Flood Jackson =

American businesswoman, suffragist and clubwoman

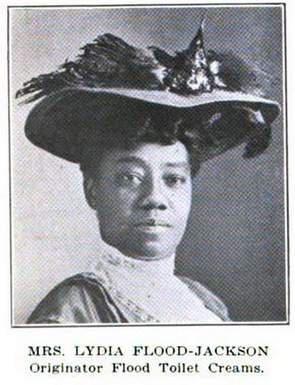
- Lydia Flood Jackson, from a 1919 publication.
- Born: Lydia Flood; June 6, 1862; Brooklyn, California
- Died: July 8, 1963 (aged 101); Oakland, California
- Occupation: Businesswoman
- Spouse: William Jackson

Lydia Flood Jackson (June 6, 1862 – July 8, 1963) was an American businesswoman, suffragist, and clubwoman.

== Family background and early life ==
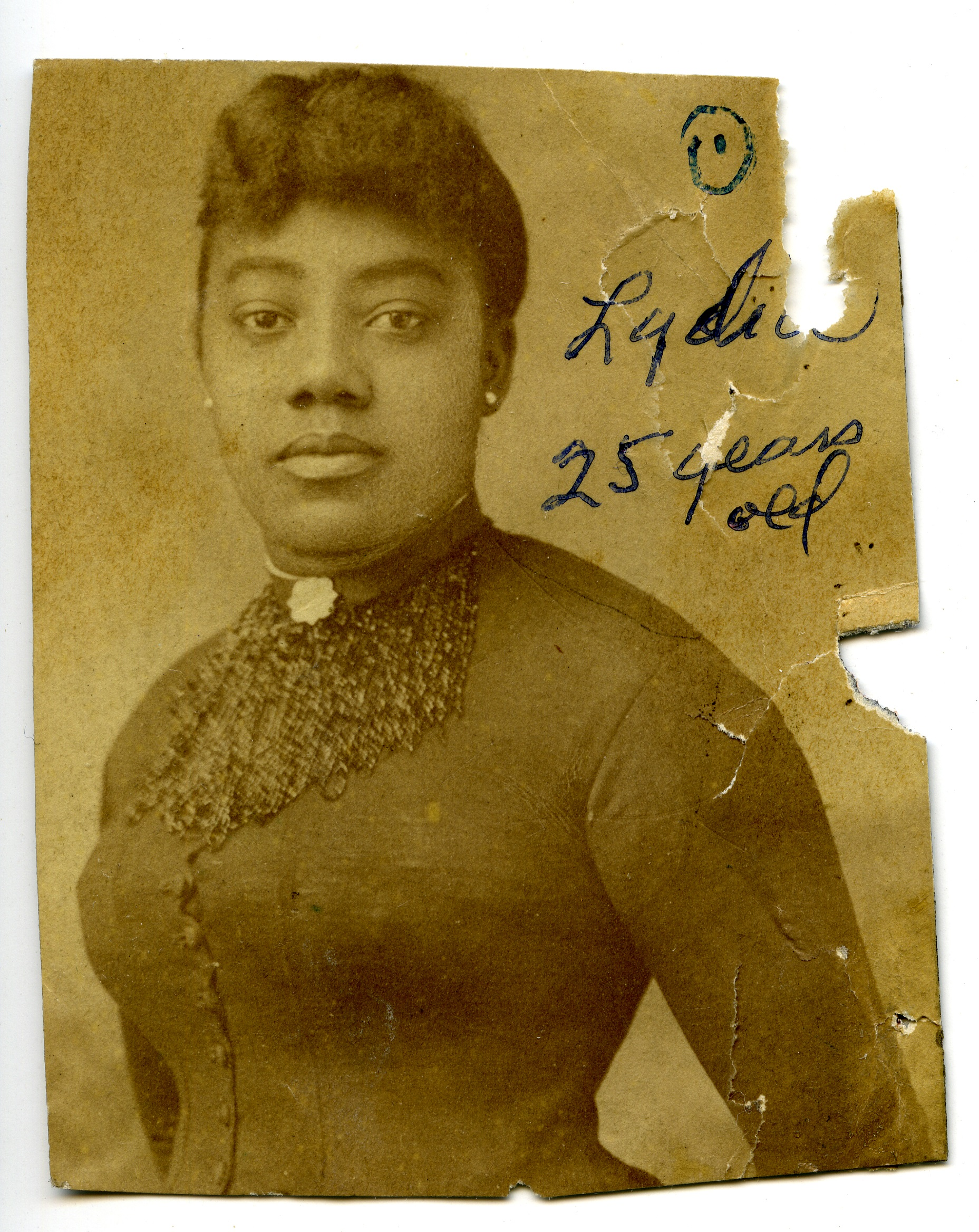
Lydia Flood Jackson in 1887.

Lydia Flood was born in Brooklyn, California now annexed to Oakland, California. Her mother was Elizabeth Thorn Scott and her father was Isaac Flood. Elizabeth Thorn Scott was born in 1828 in New York and educated in New Bedford, Massachusetts. She moved to California during the Gold Rush with husband Joseph Scott, who shortly died after settling, forcing her to raise their son Oliver alone. In the 1850s, African American children were banned from attending public school so Scott took it upon herself to establish Sacramento's first school for black children in her home on May 29, 1854. The school was accepted into Sacramento's school district but without funding and only as a segregated school. She taught here until she married Flood's father, Isaac Flood. Flood's father Isaac Flood was born a slave in South Carolina in 1816. He bought his freedom and moved west to California during the Gold Rush where he worked as a laborer and tradesman.

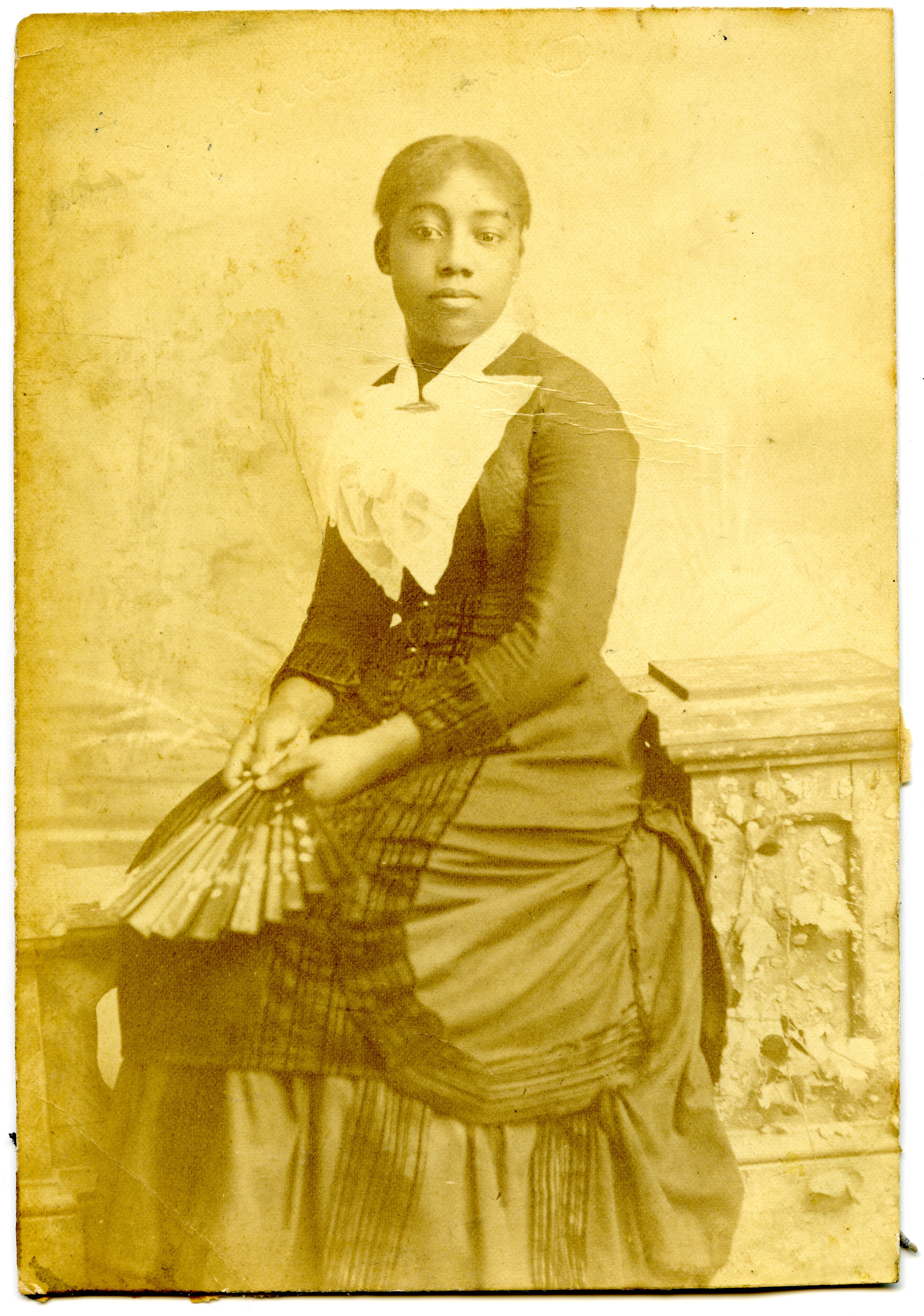
Lydia Flood Jackson circa 1880s.

Elizabeth Thorn Scott and Isaac Flood married in 1855 and moved to Oakland. They were among the earliest African American residents and were a prominent family. Isaac Flood made a fortune on real estate in the area and they both were advocates of African American civil rights and education. They also helped create Shiloh African Methodist Episcopal (AME) Church in 1858. In 1857, they had a son named George Francis Flood who is considered "the first colored child" born in Oakland. The same year, Scott established another private school from their home at 1334 East 15th Street for African Americans and non-white children, including Lydia Flood. Isaac Flood was dedicated to the advancement of civil rights for African Americans and was part of the California Colored Conventions Movement to fight segregation in California schools. Because of his advocacy, Lydia Flood was the first African American student to attend integrated John Swett School in 1872. She continued her schooling at night classes at Oakland High School. However, according to the 1940 census, she listed her highest education as 6th grade. After completing her schooling, she married William Jackson.

== Activism ==
Lydia Flood Jackson continued her family's legacy to fight for African American civil rights and was a champion of women's rights. She was an active clubwoman, and first legislative chair and first citizenship chair of the California State Federation of Colored Women's Clubs. She also implemented the use of secret ballots in the club's elections. She was a member of the Fannie Jackson Coppin Club for forty-two years and the Native Daughter's Club. She called for women's suffrage at the first meeting of the State Federation of Colored Women's Clubs, which was held in 1918 in Los Angeles. She also acknowledged the suffragists who paved the way and made reference to Oakland's namesake oak trees, saying: "Who can break through a phalanx of determined, noble-minded, upright women, backed by the power of the Holy Spirit? Suffrage stands out as one of the component factors of democracy; suffrage is one of the most powerful levers by which we hope to elevate our women to the highest planes of life...Lucretia Mott, Susan B. Anthony and Elizabeth Cady Stanton saw by an eye of faith this gleaming field sixty years ago, and their determination, true judgement and executive ability has made it possible for you and me to sit in the shade of the Suffrage Oak, a grand old tree, whose branches will soon top every State in the Union."

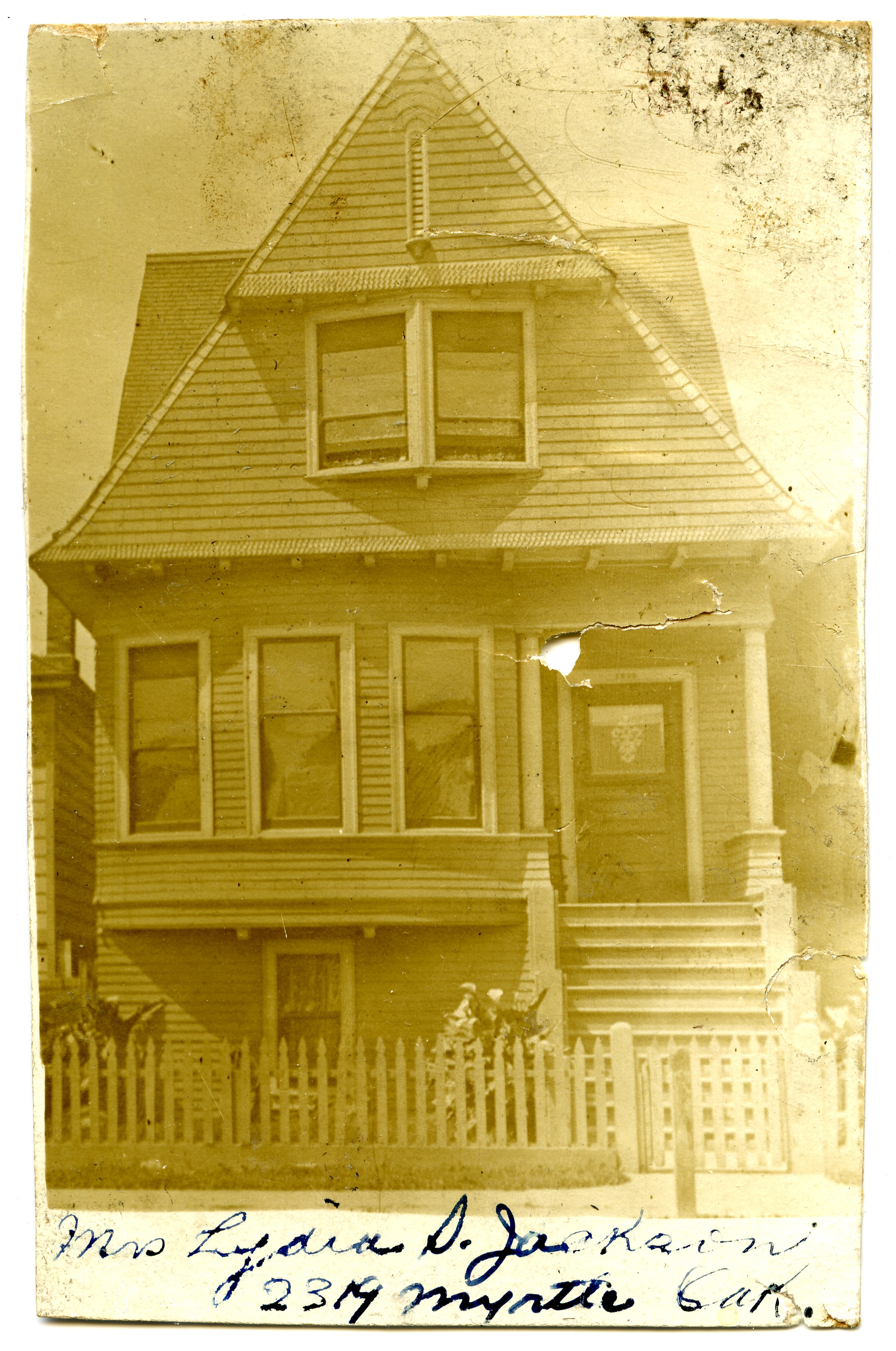
Lydia Flood Jackson's lived at 2319 Myrtle later in life.

She was a political activist and even traveled to Mexico, South America and the West Indies for lectures. Jackson wanted women to question their conventional roles and the limitations of societal norms. She also wanted women to examine and interrogate white male supremacy.

== Business ==
Lydia Flood Jackson was a businesswoman and inventor. She learned from her father how to invest in real estate which allowed her to support herself. She also created a line of beauty products of toiletries, creams and perfumes, known as "Flood Toilet Creams" which were produced and sold on the West Coast. Being a successful businesswoman and activist, she established herself within a group of powerful African Americans in the community.

== Later life and legacy ==
In the 1920 United States Federal Census, Lydia Flood Jackson was listed as widow. By the 1940s, she was living with her nephew, Leslie Flood, and his wife Julia T. Flood and son Robert F. Flood on 2319 Myrtle Street.

On the eightieth anniversary of the Shiloh African Methodist Episcopal (AME) Church, now known as the First African Methodist Episcopal Church, Jackson addressed the congregation and spoke of her mother's contributions to the church and education.

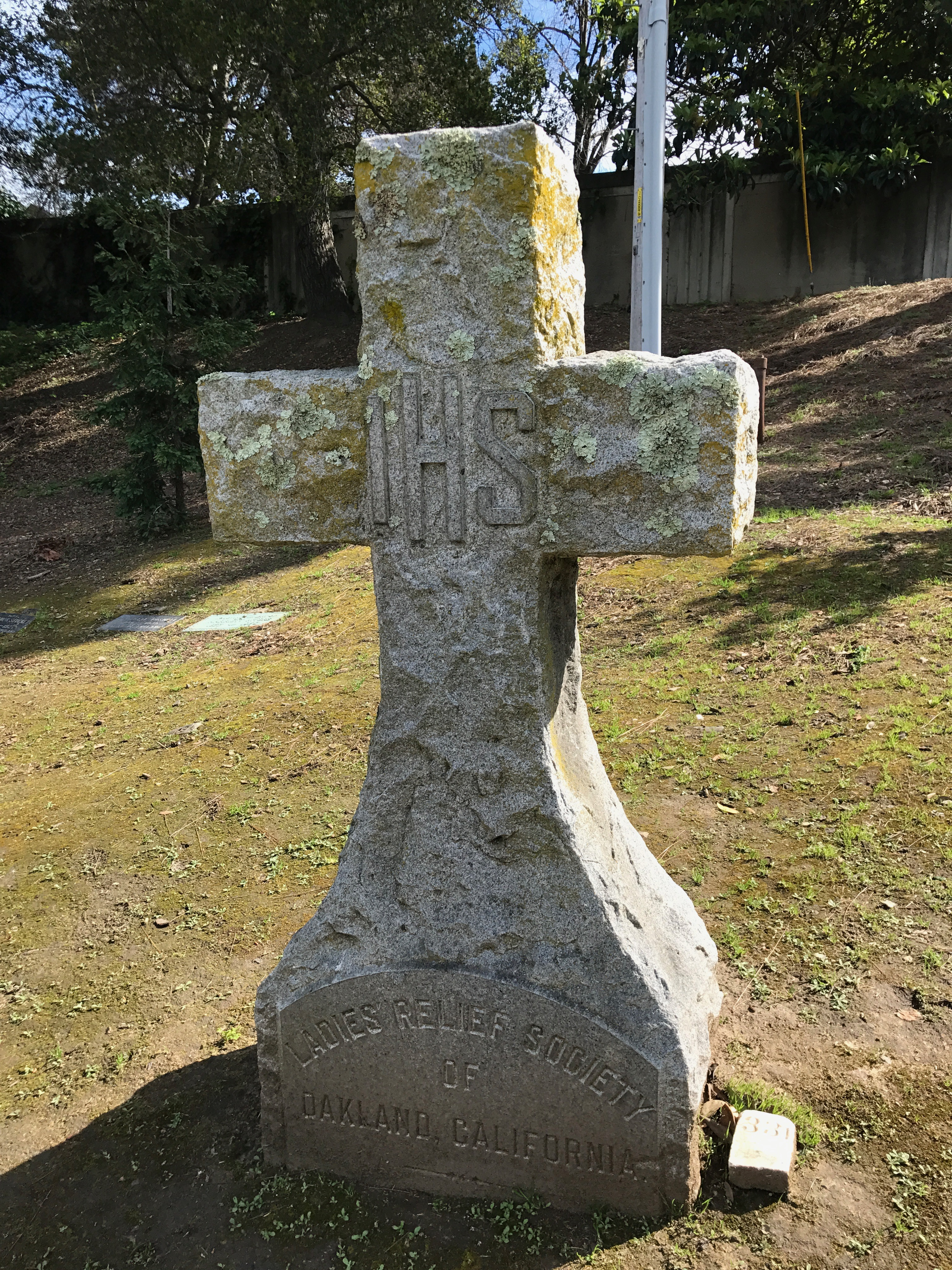
The grave marker of the Ladies Relief Society section where Flood is interred. Piedmont Funeral Services at Mountain View Cemetery records show she is located at Plot P-5, Crypt/Niche L.

On the occasion of Jackson's 100th birthday, she was honored by the City of Oakland as its "oldest living native". She died on July 8, 1963, at the age 101 at Fairmont Hospital. She is interred at Mountain View Cemetery in Oakland, California.

The Flood Family Papers are archived by the Oakland Public Library, in the African American Museum and Library at Oakland which includes Lydia Flood Jackson's funeral program, letters and family photographs.

== See also ==
Elizabeth Thorn Scott Flood
