= North Oakland Missionary Baptist Church =

African American Baptist church in Emeryville, California (1904–present)

- NOMBC
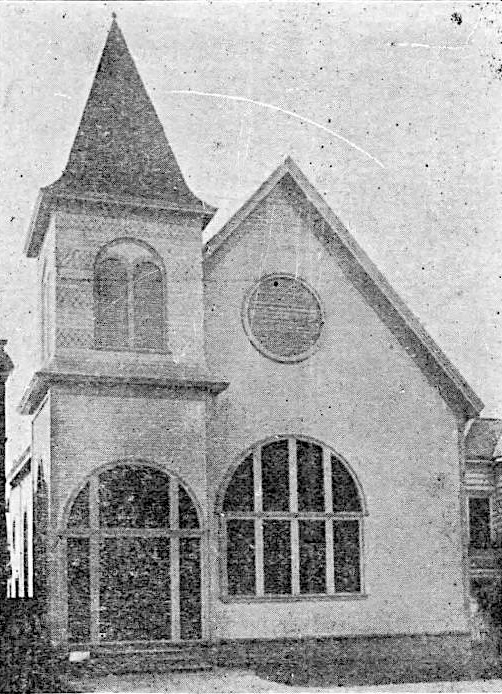
- North Oakland Missionary Baptist Church (c. 1917) former church building in Oakland, California; now home to the True Gospel Missionary Baptist Church
- North Oakland Missionary Baptist Church
- 37.823422°N 122.279034°W
- Location: 1060-32nd Street, Emeryville, California, U.S.

History
- Former name(s): Richard Clark Memorial Church (1904–1907); North Oakland Church of Christ (1908–?), North Oakland Baptist Church
- Founded: 1904; 122 years ago

North Oakland Missionary Baptist Church (NOMBC) is an American Baptist church founded in 1904, and located in Emeryville, California. It is considered one of two pioneering Baptist Black churches in the area, the other being Beth Eden Baptist Church in Oakland, California. It has moved several times over the years, and since 1921 it is located at 1060-32nd Street in Emeryville. The church was founded as Richard Clark Memorial Church, and was formerly known as the North Oakland Church of Christ, and North Oakland Baptist Church.

== History ==
It was founded as Richard Clark Memorial Church in 1904, and the church first met in the home of Rev. James A. Dennis on Myrtle Street in Oakland. As the membership of the church grew, Richard Clark donated an empty lot of land. Rev. James A. Dennis had previously served as the pastor at Beth Eden Baptist Church in Oakland, California. The first church building was completed on 29th Street under Rev. Dennis' leadership, and was named the North Oakland Church of Christ.

Sometime around 1921 they took over the building at 32nd and Linden which had been the former home to St. Paul's English Evangelical Lutheran Church, and is their current location. The church building burned down in 1930, but the congregation rebuilt. The current version of their building was completed in May 1960, under the leadership of Rev. Ansel Ogden Bell.

Under the leadership of Rev. Claude B. Murray in the 1970s, the church performed numerous ministries internationally, including in Haiti and Liberia.

In 2002, a joint project between the North Oakland Missionary Baptist Church and Oakland Community Housing Inc. (a nonprofit affiliate supporting the Oakland Housing Authority) broke ground to build 65-units of affordable senior housing at the Sylvester Rutledge Manor, 3255 San Pablo Avenue in Emeryville. It was completed in July 2003, and named in honor of one of the former pastorate who led the project.

In February 2023, the First African Methodist Episcopal Church (FAME) at 3701 Telegraph Avenue in Oakland was destroyed by a fire, and for a year they held their services at North Oakland Missionary Baptist Church.

In 2023, North Oakland Missionary Baptist Church experienced financial issues with back due taxes due. The local community raised the funds and paid off the debt with help from the West Oakland faith community, the Interfaith Council of Alameda County (ICAC), Central Hills East Oakland Congregations, and the Statewide Baptist Association.

== Pastors ==
- Rev. James A. Dennis, 1905 to 1908
- Rev. C. X. Laws
- Rev. T. M. Davis
- Rev. Brown
- Rev. Gordon Corolenus (“G.C.”) Coleman, 1913 to 1942
- Rev. Ansel Ogden Bell, 1940 to 1967
- Rev. Claude B. Murray, 1967 to 1982
- Rev. Sylvester Rutledge, 1982 to 1984
- Rev. Lloyd C. Blue, 1984 to 1990
- Rev. Sylvester Rutledge, 1991 to 2024
- Bishop Gregory B. Payton, 2025 to present

== See also ==
- African Americans in California
- African Americans in the East Bay (San Francisco Bay Area)
- Racial segregation of churches in the United States
