= Harold Jenkins (nightclub owner) =

American night-club owner (1890–1967)

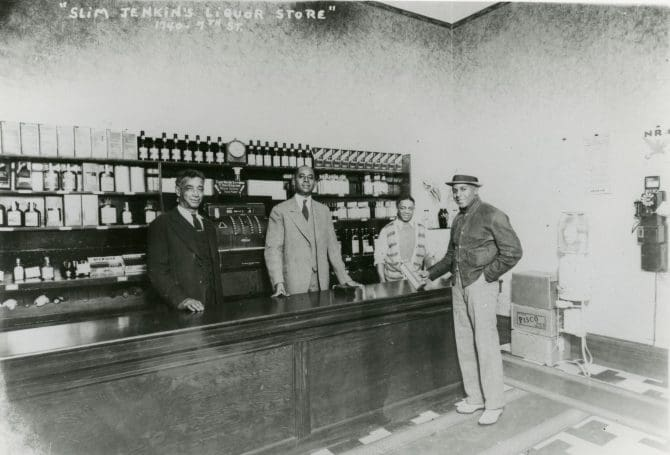
Interior of Slim Jenkins' liquor store, 1740 7th St. Oakland, California, December 20, 1933. Jenkins pictured in the center, second person from the left.

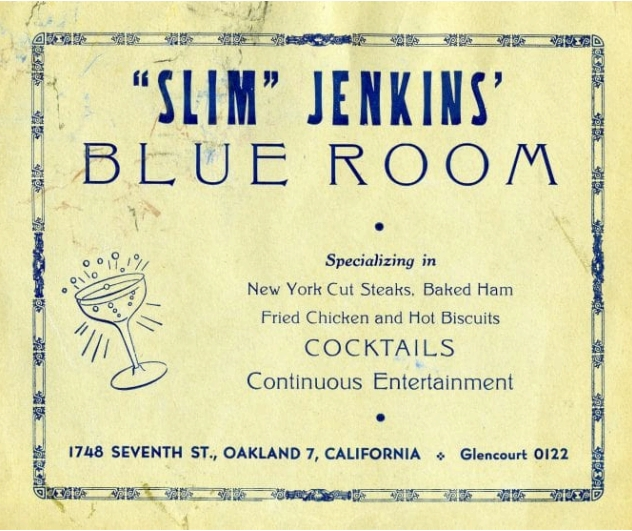
Slim Jenkins' liquor store in Oakland, California quickly expanded into a multifaceted location including a nightclub, as seen here advertised on a print flyer.

Harold "Slim" Jenkins (1890–1967) was the prominent African-American founder of the Slim Jenkins Cafe, a premier night club in West Oakland in the 1930s through the 1960s that featured such stars as B.B. King, The Ink Spots, Dinah Washington, and other major jazz and blues groups. Both the nightclub's centrality and Jenkins' charismatic personality earned him the nickname the "Mayor" of West Oakland. The cafe, located on Wood Street between 7th and 8th Street, was an important part of the rise of the 7th Street corridor, an epicenter of Black culture in the Bay Area including soul food restaurants, clubs, and other black-owned businesses. In addition to music, the club was also a popular spot for hosting black men's social clubs and other groups that increased the visibility of African-American life within the city of Oakland.

== Biography ==
On July 22, 1890, Harold Jenkins was born in Monroe, Louisiana. After World War I, Jenkins moved to Oakland, California and worked as waiter. Oakland became an epicenter of Black Culture as African-Americans migrated from the South to the West Coast. Jenkins saved up his money and opened a liquor store right after prohibition ended in 1933. He opened the nightclub soon thereafter. Slim Jenkins Supper Club included multiple parts: the nightclub, restaurant, banquet space, and market. He was a member of the NAACP and the Boys Club of Oakland.

== Legacy ==
A mixed use building in West Oakland, including 32 affordable residential apartments, is named after Jenkins, "Slim Jenkins Court" and is located one block away from Jenkin's original club.
