= Brooklyn, California =

US settlement

Coordinates: 37°47′18.74″N 122°14′57.89″W

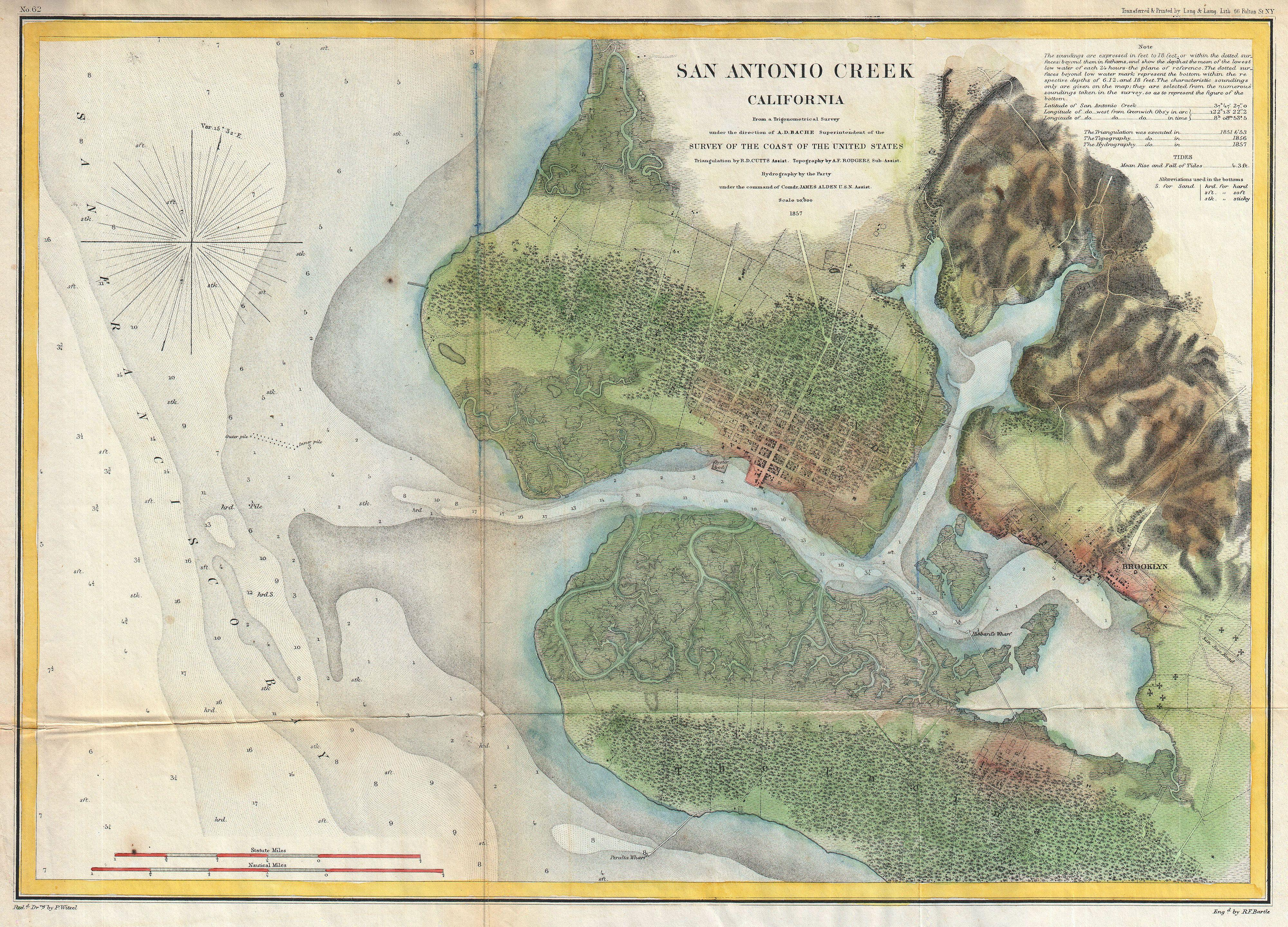
1857 Map showing Brooklyn

Brooklyn is a former city in Alameda County, California, United States, annexed to Oakland in 1872.

== History ==
Brooklyn was first formed in 1856 by the amalgamation of two settlements, the sites of which are both now within the city limits of Oakland: San Antonio and Clinton. The name "Brooklyn" commemorates the ship that had brought Mormon settlers to California in 1846. In 1870, Brooklyn absorbed the nearby town of Lynn, which housed a footwear industry, and incorporated as a city.

The San Francisco and Oakland Railroad had built a station at San Antonio. When the Central Pacific Railroad took over the line in 1870, the name was changed to "Brooklyn".

In 1872, voters approved their city's annexation by Oakland. Afterward, when the Southern Pacific Railroad took over the rail line in 1883, the Brooklyn station name was changed to "East Oakland".

A post office was opened in Brooklyn in 1855; it became a branch of the Oakland post office in 1878. The Brooklyn Colored School was opened in 1867 by Mary J. Sanderson, daughter of abolitionist Jeremiah Burke Sanderson, it was the first Black school in the area; by 1872 the school was annexed to Oakland.

In historical maps, Brooklyn is shown as a fairly large area, lying adjacent and to the south of Lake Merritt and the Piedmont tract, and adjacent and to the north of Alameda, the San Leandro Creek, and the town of San Leandro. Today this is East Oakland.

== Demographics ==
Brooklyn first appeared as a city in the 1870 United States census.

Historical population
Census	Pop.	Note	%±
1870	1,603		—
U.S. Decennial Census; 1860–1870 1880-1890; 1900 1910 1920; 1930 1940 1950; 1960 1970 1980; 1990 2000 2010
