= Frances Mary Albrier =

American civil rights activist

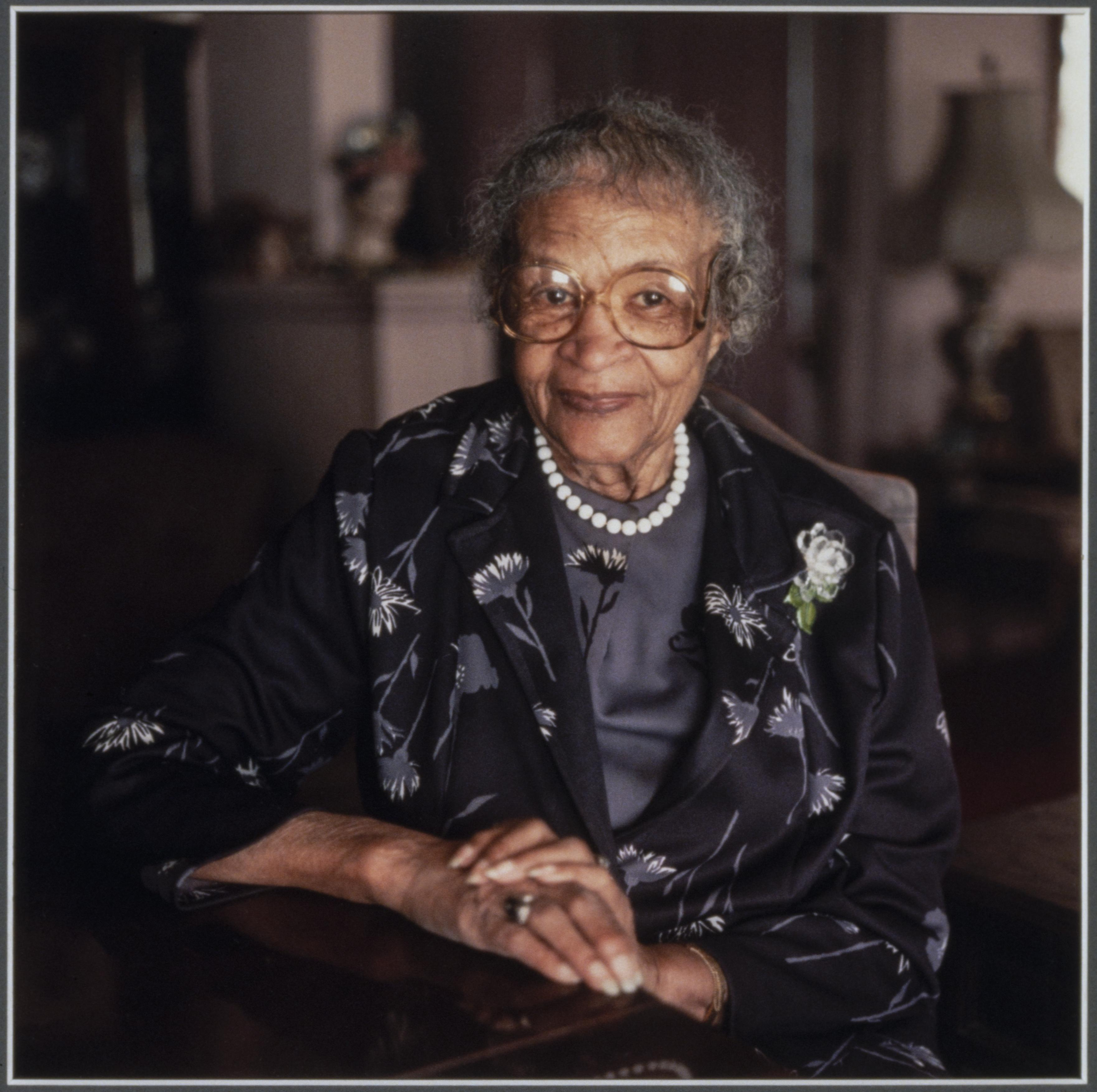
- Born: September 21, 1898; Mount Vernon, New York
- Died: August 21, 1987 (aged 88)
- Education: Tuskegee Institute; Howard University; University of California, Berkeley
- Occupation: Civil rights activist
- Known for: Berkeley Unified School District
- Spouses: William Albert Jackson (m. 1922) Willie Antoine Albrier (m. 1938)
- Children: 3
- Awards: "Fight for Freedom" Award

Frances Mary Albrier (September 21, 1898 – August 21, 1987) was an American civil rights activist and community leader.

== Early life and education ==
Albrier was born in Mount Vernon, New York in 1898, and was raised in Tuskegee, Alabama by her grandparents. She attended the Tuskegee Institute through high school. She received a B.A. from Howard University in 1920, and moved to Berkeley, California, where she attended the University of California, Berkeley. Upon graduating from the University of California, Berkeley, Albrier trained to be a nurse for two years, but struggled to find professional work following the training. This difficulty finding work led to Albrier's involvement with the UNIA, becoming a nurse for the Black Cross.

== Career ==
Undated photo of Albrier

Albrier became active in local politics in 1938 in Alameda County, California, where she was elected to serve as a Democratic Central Committeewoman. Motivated to increase the diversity in Berkeley's workforce, Albrier ran for Berkeley city council in 1939, but ultimately lost the race. Following her run for city council, she founded the East Bay Women's Welfare Club of mothers in an attempt to increase the number of Black teachers working at Berkeley schools. Albrier's involvement within the Berkeley community came from her observation that the Black taxpayers of Berkeley were not represented well enough in the city government, schools, or recreational centers.

Albrier played an important role in eliminating discrimination against hiring Black teachers in the Berkeley, California public schools.

In 1942, Albrier trained as a welder, in order to contribute to the World War II war effort. Initially the Boilermakers Union was unwilling to accept her as a member, despite the fact that she completed double the amount of training hours required. However, after a lawsuit threat from Albrier and pressure from the community, the Union eventually accepted her as a member and she became the first Black woman to be hired at Kaiser Shipyards in Richmond, California. Despite her admittance into the Boilermakers Union, Albrier was transferred to an auxiliary union in Oakland, California due to the lack of a segregated Black auxiliary in Richmond.

She received the NAACP "Fight for Freedom" Award in 1954.
