= J. B. Larue =

American politician (1800–1872)

Member of the California State Senate from the Alameda County district
- In office 1857

Personal details
- Born: James Buskirk Larue; February 6, 1800 Franklin, New Jersey, U.S.
- Died: January 7, 1872 (aged 71) Alameda County, California, U.S.
- Profession: Politician, businessman

James Buskirk Larue (February 6, 1800 – January 7, 1872) was a California businessman and politician who founded the village of San Antonio in what is now Oakland, California.

== Life and work ==
Larue was born James Buskirk Larue in Franklin, New Jersey, on February 6, 1800.

In 1835, Larue migrated from New Jersey to Pipestone Township, Michigan, where he purchased land and built a sawmill. From 1840 to 1841, Larue served as a representative in the Michigan legislature. In 1850 he left Michigan for the California gold rush.

Once in California, Larue purchased part of the Rancho San Antonio lands from Luis Maria Peralta in 1851, building a wharf and store at the same location.

In 1857, Larue was elected to the California State Senate representing the county of Alameda.

In 1858, Larue began the Oakland and San Antonio Steam Navigation Company, operating a cut-rate passenger ferry between Oakland and San Francisco. Larue was sued by his competitor Minturn, who claimed an exclusive contract with the city of Oakland to operate the Oakland-San Francisco ferry route. The case was appealed to the U.S. Supreme court, with Minturn's exclusivity claims being rejected.

Larue died January 7, 1872, in Alameda County.
