= Jeremiah Burke Sanderson =

African American abolitionist (1821–1875)

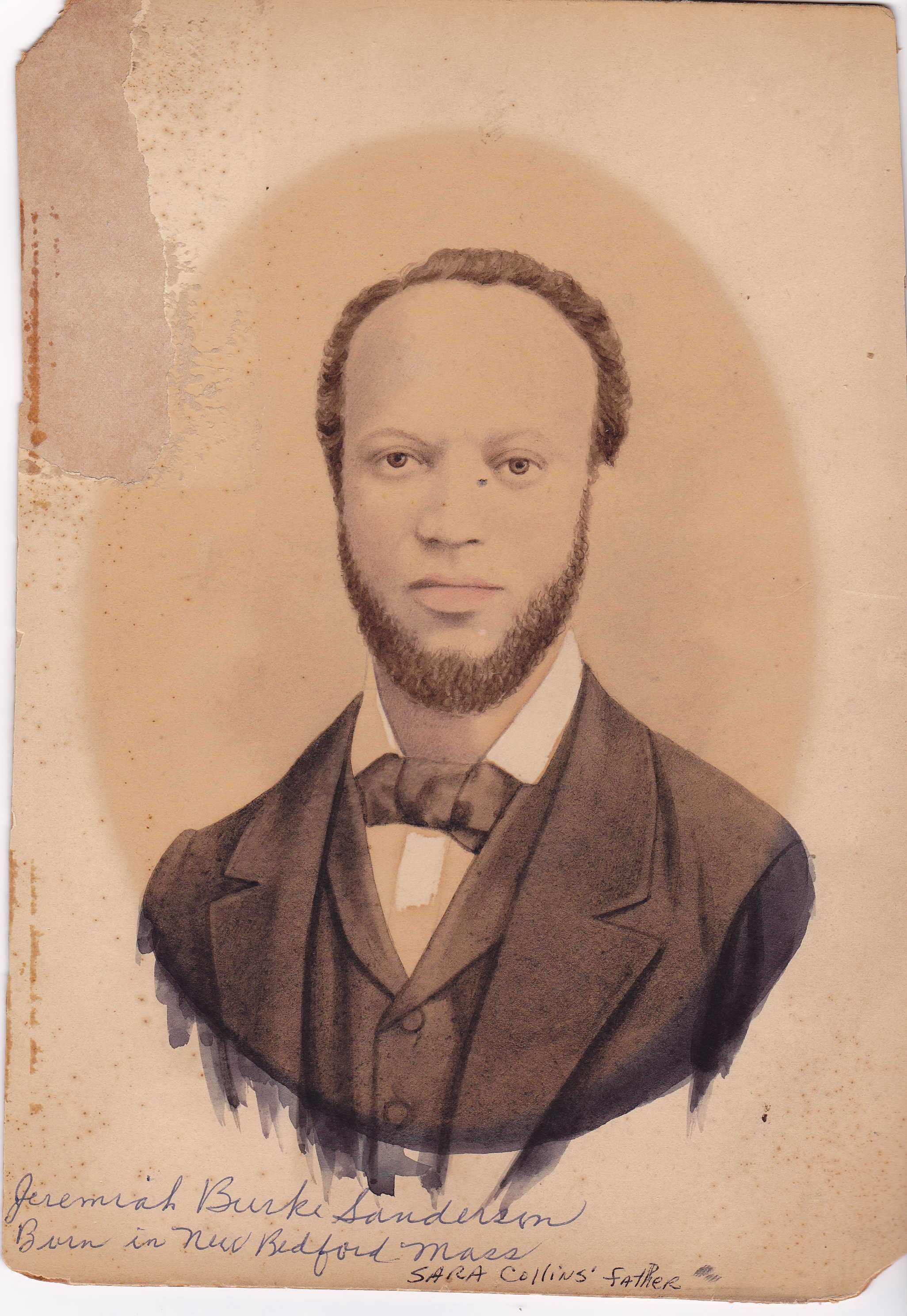
- Born: August 10, 1821; New Bedford, Massachusetts, US
- Died: August 19, 1875 (aged 54); Oakland, California, US
- Other name: J. B. Sanderson
- Occupations: Educator, abolitionist, minister
- Known for: Influential educator and activist for rights of colored people in early California
- Spouse: Catherine Elizabeth Molyneaux

Jeremiah Burke Sanderson (August 10, 1821 – August 19, 1875) was an American abolitionist, pastor, and advocate for the civil and educational rights of Black citizens in the United States. Growing up in New Bedford, Massachusetts, Sanderson in his early life was surrounded by the work of notable abolitionists, including Frederick Douglass, Harriet Tubman, William Lloyd Garrison, and William Nell. These influences, combined with his studies of literature, philosophy, and history enabled him to become an eloquent spokesperson for black civil rights. Sanderson is credited with establishing the first publicly funded school for black children in the state of California.

== Life in New Bedford, Massachusetts ==
=== Early years ===
Jeremiah Sanderson was born on August 10, 1821, to Daniel Sanderson and Sarah Burke in New Bedford, Bristol County, Massachusetts. His mother, Sarah, was part Wampanoag, and Daniel was part African American and part Scottish. Daniel Sanderson left the family when Jeremiah was nine years old. Jeremiah Sanderson received a good education, and became an ardent student.

=== Influences ===
The environment in which Sanderson grew up enabled him to become the powerful organizer and spokesperson that he became. During his early years, he watched African Americans vote, attended public schools, and was surrounded by the achievements of notable abolitionists such as Harriet Tubman and William Lloyd Garrison. Later in life he was strongly influenced by Frederick Douglass and William C. Nell as he worked closely with them.

=== Occupations ===
In New Bedford, Sanderson worked weekdays as a barber in downtown New Bedford. On Sundays, Sanderson would preach at the pulpit of local New Bedford religious societies, despite not being an ordained minister at the time.

=== Activism ===
Sanderson was elected secretary of the New Bedford Colored Citizens at only nineteen. In 1840, he met William C. Nell and Frederick Douglass, abolitionists from Boston, Massachusetts. Sanderson became acquainted with both and continued to work with them throughout his life. Throughout the 1840s, Sanderson traveled to various cities in Massachusetts and New York lecturing about the evils of slavery. One speech he gave in Lynn, Massachusetts, was nearly published in the New York Tribune. When Sanderson traveled to Lynn, Massachusetts to speak, he stayed with Frederick Douglass and his family. In 1841, Sanderson gave a speech at the Massachusetts Anti-Slavery Society meeting that impressed many other well-known abolitionists including Parker Pillsbury and Edward Quincy. In 1853, Sanderson was appointed as a delegate for the National Convention of Colored People, and in 1854 became a member of the State Council of Colored People of Massachusetts.

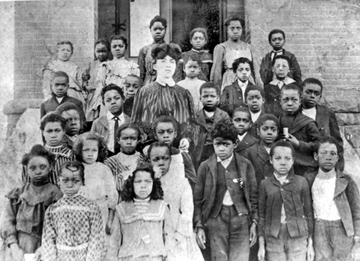
Brooklyn Colored School students with their teacher, Mary Sanderson in 1870

== Family ==
On February 4, 1849, Jeremiah Sanderson (age 27) married Catherine Molyneaux (age 19) in New Bedford, Bristol County, Massachusetts. He and his wife had a large family, with the following children: William N. Sanderson, Mary J. Sanderson, Florence T. Sanderson, Kate C. Sanderson, Sarah E. Sanderson, Jeremiah Sanderson, Charles G. Sanderson, and Abraham L. Sanderson. In 1854, Jeremiah Sanderson moved to California temporarily leaving his wife and then four children in New Bedford as he sought to improve his financial situation. While they would eventually be united in California before 1860, letters written by Sanderson to his family reveal the anguish that the period of separation caused him. Sanderson's daughter Mary Sanderson Grasses would later become the first Black public school teacher in Oakland, California.

== Transition to California ==
Beginning a new period in his life, Sanderson left his family behind in New Bedford, boarded the steamer S. S. Sonora, and departed for California amid circulating tales of great economic prosperity in the State. Particularly, the gold rush beginning in 1849, and the fact that California was a free, non-slave state made it an appealing location with potential for Sanderson and other African Americans. He had hopes of increasing his wealth, and then returning to be united with his family once again. Upon arriving in San Francisco, Sanderson's talent for delivering passionate speeches was immediately recognized, and he immediately began to make leading speeches at anti-slavery events. This would be the beginning of Sanderson's efforts in the west to advocate for Black rights and education. In the coming decades, he opened and obtain public funding for Black schools, speak at events, preach in churches, and encourage equal rights for Blacks and whites in each opportunity that he saw.

=== Sacramento ===
Sanderson's first destination after arriving in San Francisco was Sacramento. Here, he quickly noticed that a community with over two-hundred school-age Black children had no public school. Rather, only one private school for Black children existed in the basement of teacher Elizabeth Scott. Determined to give all Black children in the community an equal chance to learn, Sanderson began conversing with the Sacramento Board of education with the hope that public funding could be obtained to operate a public Black school. With persistent effort from Sanderson, the school board agreed to fund a Black school, which opened in 1855 with Sanderson as the teacher. He noticed soon after that the provided funding was insufficient, and after more letters addressed to the school board he successfully obtained more funds. Although not required, Sanderson also passed an examination which granted him a teaching certificate during his time in Sacramento, and became one of the few colored teachers in the state with this certification.

In addition to greatly improving the educational rights for Blacks in Sacramento, Sanderson remained active in community as a civil rights activist. Sanderson was appointed to be the secretary for the first convention of the Colored Citizens of the State of California. He then became a member of the publishing committee, which distributed the ideas from the conference in pamphlets. He continued to serve in the position of secretary for the second convention of this organization, and took on additional responsibilities on the committee of free press as well.

Starting in 1855, Sanderson became active in the annual California State Convention of Colored Citizens, a local colored convention.

From 1856 to 1858, little information exists on Sanderson's actions in the community, where he lived, or how he spent his time. Based on letters sent back and forth between Sanderson and his family, this period was difficult for Sanderson as he missed his family greatly.

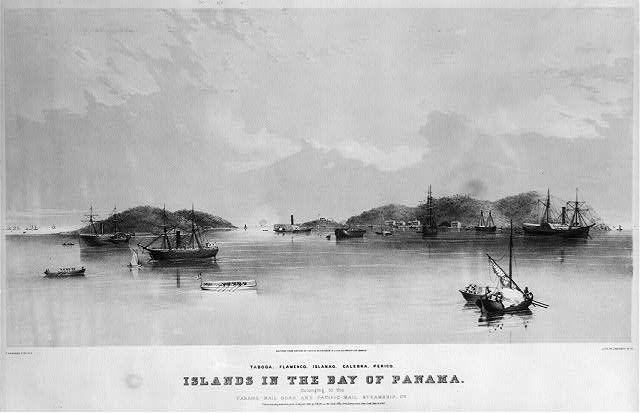
An image belonging to the Pacific Mail Steamship Co, depicting what Sanderson's journey from New Bedford to San Francisco may have looked like.

=== San Francisco ===
In 1859, Sanderson returned to San Francisco where he became a teacher at a public black school that resided in the basement of a church. Upon his arrival, he noticed that for the size of the city, very few Black children were present in school. As a response Sanderson sent letters to parents of Black children urging them to take advantage of the public school system.

Sanderson continued his efforts to improve the quality of education for Black children in San Francisco. He once again reached out to the school board, and secured funding to construct a new building that would allow his school to move out of the basement of a church. This new school, named the Broadway School, opened in 1864, and five years later Sanderson was promoted to principal of the school. However, his time as principal was unfortunately short-lived, as his Black assistant quit, and a white woman was hired as a replacement. It was seen as unacceptable during this time for a white woman to work under the direction of a Black man, thus he was forced to step down to the position of teacher.

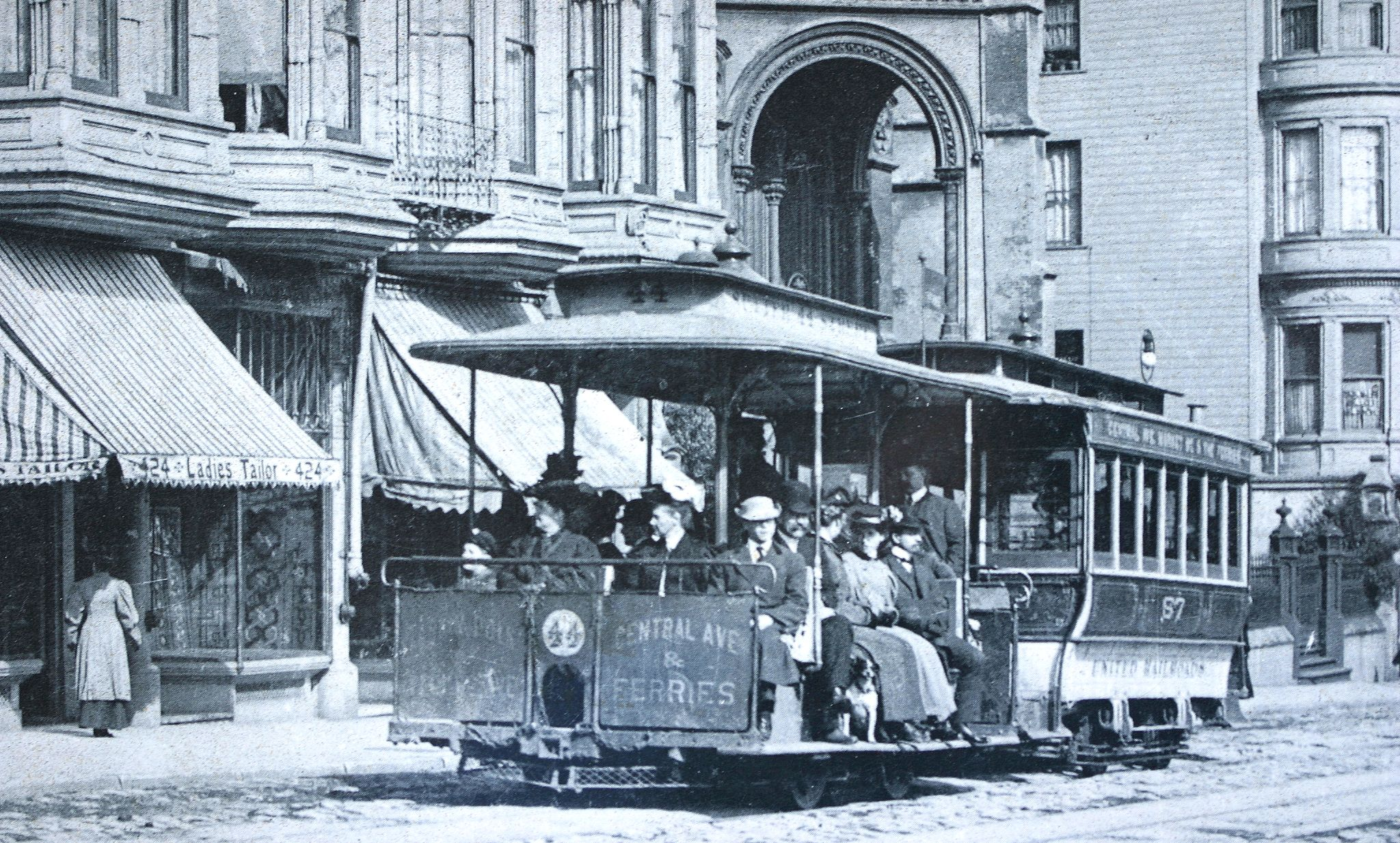
Early San Francisco

=== Stockton ===
Shortly after losing his position as principal, Sanderson relocated to Stockton, California, where he continued to strengthen the educational system for Black children through teaching. His excellence in his teaching position soon gave him a reputation that spread throughout the cities of California, which resulted in certain Black families sending their children to Sanderson's school from great distances. Following his earlier actions in Sacramento and San Francisco, Sanderson continued to write letters to the school board. He, and many others, became pleased with the progress that the school had made.

=== Oakland ===
Sanderson spent his last days in Oakland, California, where his priorities shifted to church matters. While he lived in Oakland that he became the secretary of the 1875 annual conference of the African Methodist Churches of California. Sanderson served as the pastor of the First African Methodist Episcopal Church in Oakland (formerly known as Shiloh A.M.E. Church) from 1874 until his death in 1875.

== Death ==
Sanderson was killed instantly on August 19, 1875 when he was struck by a Southern Pacific train.
