= Lynn, Oakland, California =

Former settlement in California, U.S.

Coordinates: 37.8011°N 122.2331°W

Lynn is a former settlement in Alameda County, California, United States. It was located northeast of Brooklyn. In 1870, Lynn and Brooklyn incorporated as Brooklyn In 1872, voters approved the annexation by Oakland. Lynn hosted a large shoe and boot factory, the "Lynn Boot and Shoe Manufacturing Company" which incorporated in 1869 and was named after Lynn, Massachusetts which also had a large footwear industry.
