= Mountain View Cemetery (Oakland, California) =

Historic rural cemetery in Alameda County

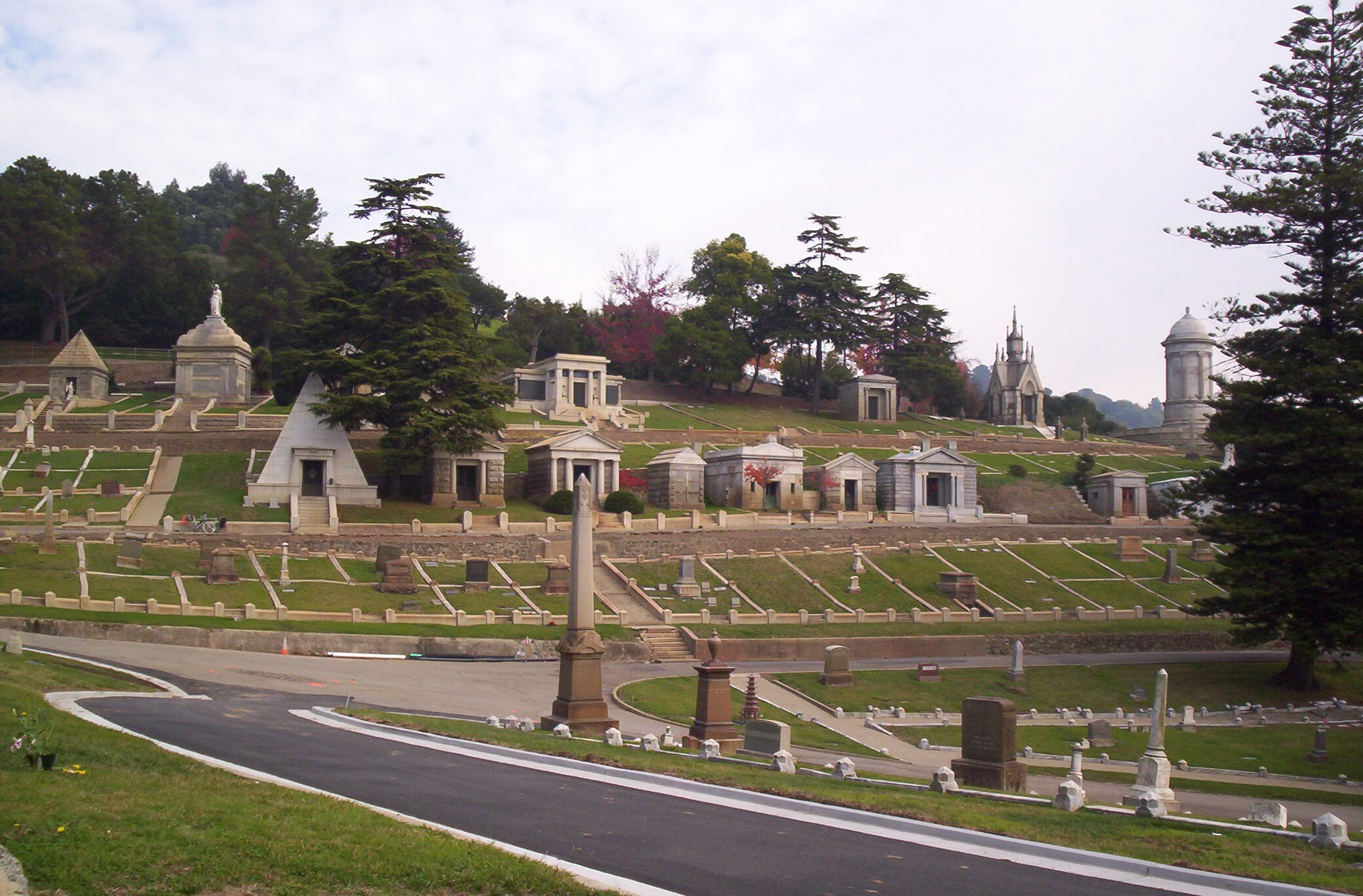
- Millionaire's Row, Mountain View Cemetery, Oakland, California
- Interactive map of Mountain View Cemetery

Details
- Established: 1863
- Location: Oakland, California
- Country: United States
- Coordinates: 37°50′07″N 122°14′13″W
- Type: Nonprofit
- Size: 226 acres (91 ha)
- No. of graves: > 24,000
- Website: www.mountainviewcemetery.org

Mountain View Cemetery is a 226-acre (91 ha) rural cemetery in Oakland, California, United States. It was established in 1863 by a group of East Bay pioneers under the California Rural Cemetery Act of 1859. The association they formed still operates the cemetery today. Mountain View was designed by Frederick Law Olmsted, the landscape architect who also designed New York City's Central Park, Brooklyn’s Prospect Park, and much of UC Berkeley and Stanford University.

Many of California's important historical figures, drawn by Olmsted's reputation, are buried here. There are many grandiose crypts in tribute to the wealthy, especially along the ridge section with a view across the Bay to the San Francisco skyline, known as "Millionaires' Row". Because of this, and its beautiful setting, the cemetery is a tourist draw. Tours led by docents began in 1970.

== Design ==
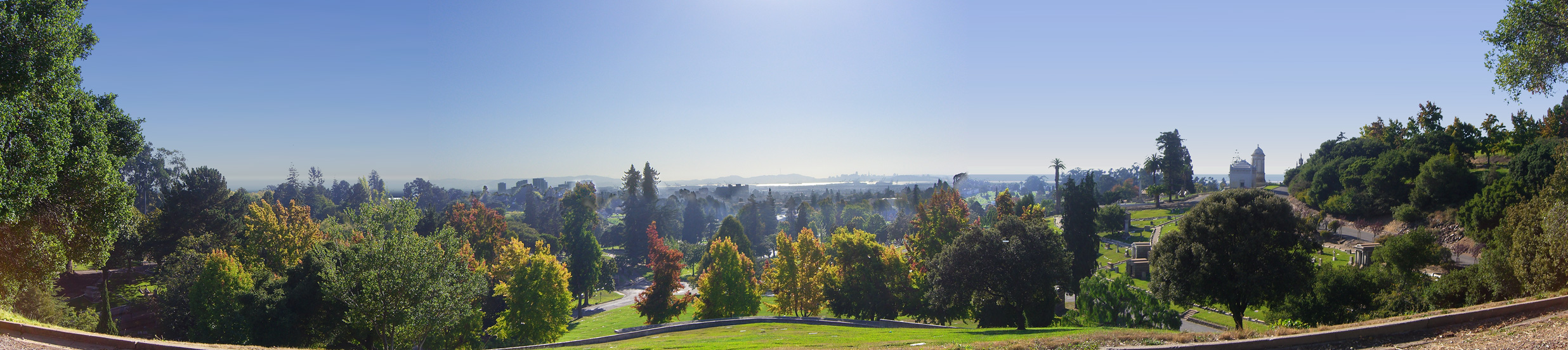
Panoramic view from the rear of the cemetery, looking out across the San Francisco Bay

Olmsted's intent was to create a space that would express a harmony between humankind and the natural setting. In the view of 19th century English and American romantics, park-like cemeteries, such as Mountain View, represented the peace of nature, to which humanity's soul returns. Olmsted, drawing upon the concepts of American Transcendentalism, integrated Parisian grand monuments and broad avenues.

Adjoining Mountain View Cemetery is Saint Mary Cemetery and the Chapel of the Chimes mausoleum and columbarium.

== Notable burials ==
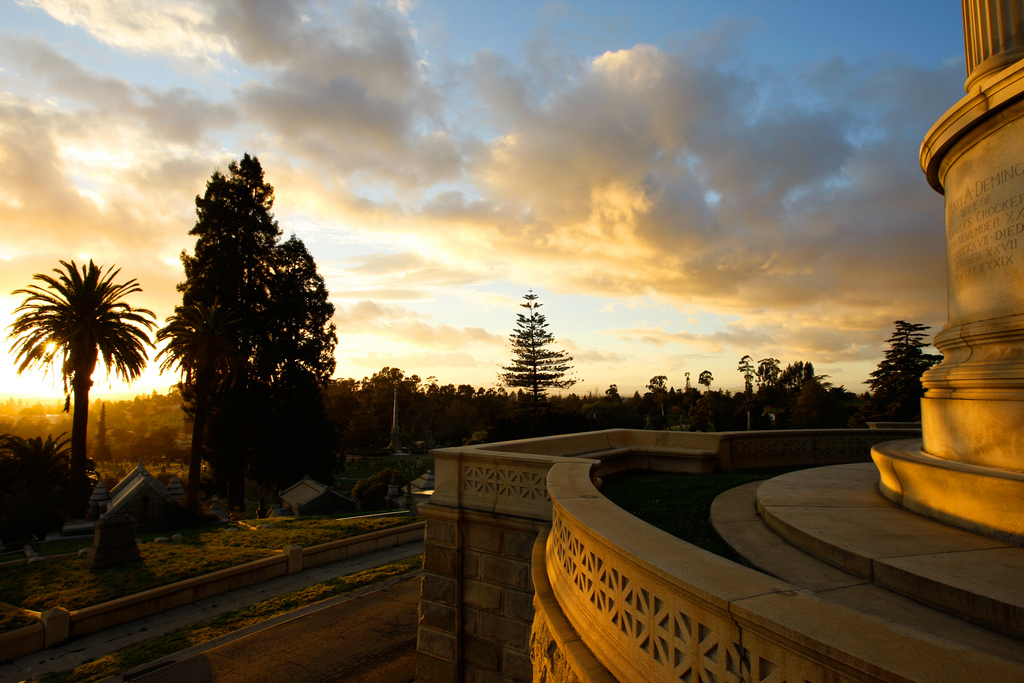
View of the cemetery from Charles Crocker's tomb

There are many notable people interred in Mountain View; many are local figures in California history, but others have achieved wider fame.

=== Politicians and government officials ===
- Washington Bartlett, Mayor of San Francisco (1882–1884), Governor of California (1887)
- Coles Bashford, Governor of Wisconsin and Arizona Territory politician
- Leonard W. Buck, rancher, California State Senator.
- Warren B. English, US Representative (D) California
- John B. Felton, Mayor of Oakland (1869–1870)
- William M. Gwin, one of California's first U.S. Senators
- Henry H. Haight, Governor of California (1867–1871)
- William Knowland, U.S. Senator, Publisher, Oakland Tribune
- Adolphus Frederic St. Sure, Federal Judge
- Samuel Merritt, early Mayor of Oakland
- Romualdo Pacheco, Governor of California (1875)
- George Pardee, Governor of California (1903–1907)
- George C. Perkins, Governor of California (1880–1883); U.S. Senator (1893–1915).
- Richard P. Hammond, Speaker of the California State Assembly (January–May 1852) and former U.S. Army Major

=== Industrialists and business people ===
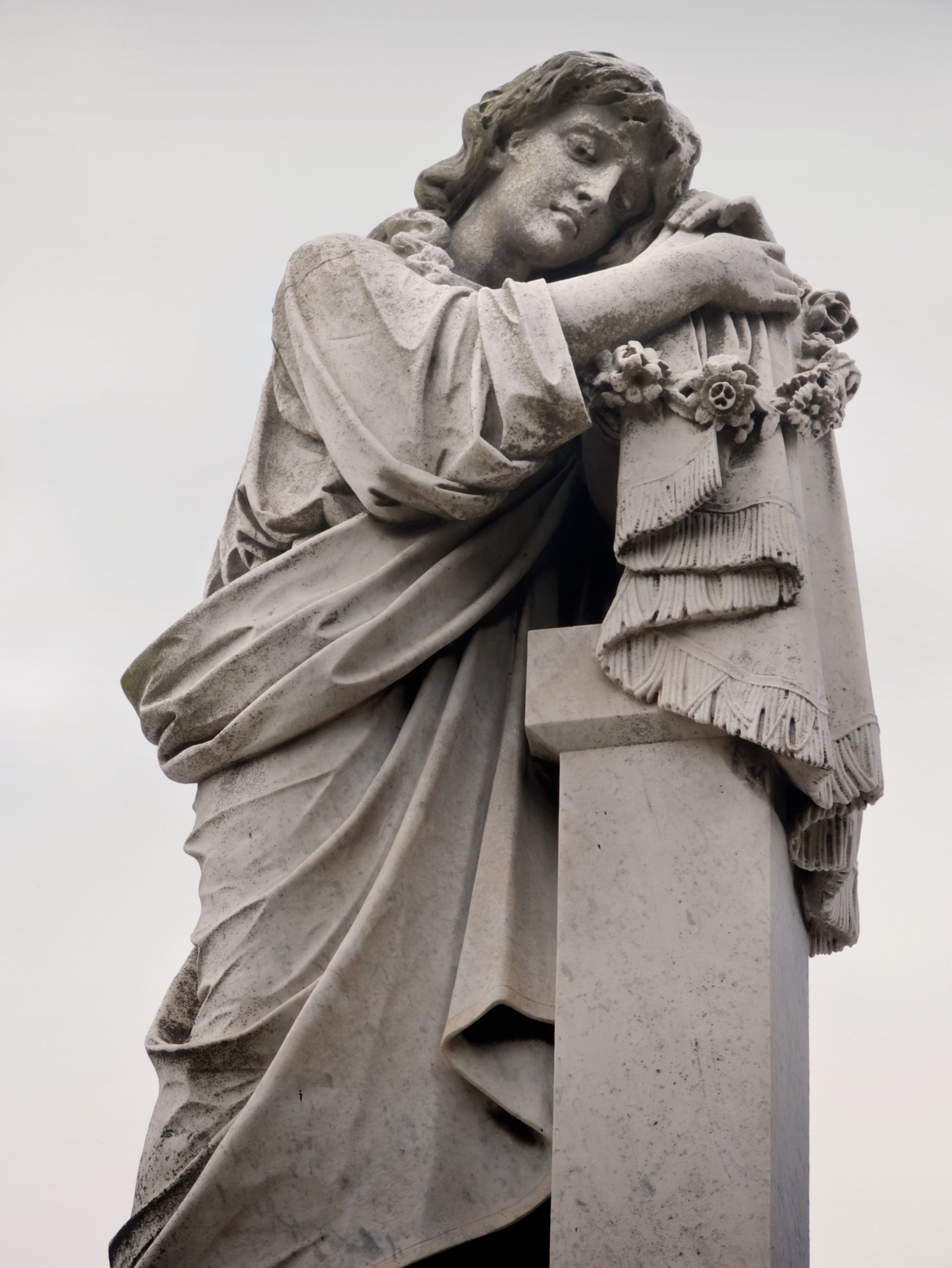
The statue above Domingo Ghirardelli's mausoleum.

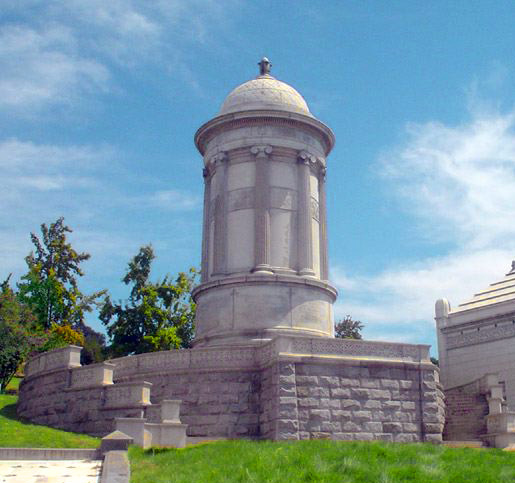
The Crocker mausoleum on Millionaires' Row

- Warren A. Bechtel (1872–1933), industrialist, founder of the Bechtel company
- Anthony Chabot, the "Water King", father of hydraulic mining and benefactor of Chabot Space & Science Center
- Charles Crocker, railroad magnate, banker
- William E. Dargie, owner, Oakland Tribune
- J. A. Folger, founder of Folgers Coffee
- Peter Folger (1905–1980), American coffee heir, socialite
- Domingo Ghirardelli, namesake of the Ghirardelli Chocolate Company
- Charles Goodall, co-founder of the Pacific Coast Steamship Company
- Henry J. Kaiser (1882–1967), father of modern American shipbuilding
- Ingemar Henry Lundquist, mechanical engineer, and inventor of over the wire balloon angioplasty
- Zedekiah Johnson Purnell (1813–1882), African-American activist, and businessman
- Joe Shoong, Chinese immigrant and founder of the National Dollar Stores chain
- Francis Marion Smith, the "Borax King"

=== Military ===
- Henry Brevard Davidson, brigadier general in the Confederate States Army
- John Coffee Hays, Texas Ranger and first sheriff of San Francisco
- Eli L. Huggins, Indian Wars soldier and Medal of Honor recipient
- Henry T. Johns, American Civil War soldier and Medal of Honor recipient
- Oscar Fitzalan Long, Indian Wars soldier and Medal of Honor recipient
- Jeremiah C. Sullivan, Union Army general and staff member of Ulysses S. Grant
- Obediah Summers, formerly enslaved, in the 18th United States Colored Infantry Regiment
- Adam Weissel, United States Navy sailor and Medal of Honor recipient

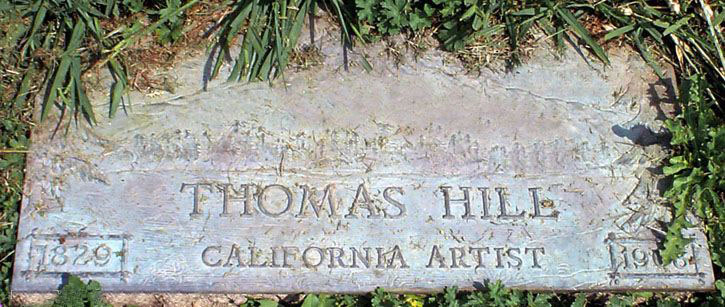
Thomas Hill's grave marker

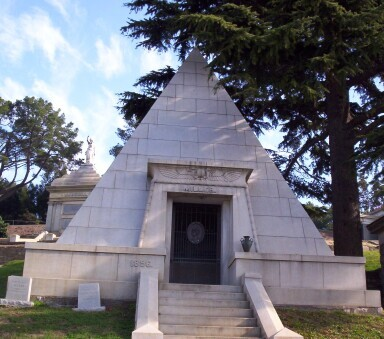
The Miller Crypt pyramid.

=== Arts and culture ===
- Lucy Adeline Briggs Cole Rawson Peckinpah Smallman, botanical artist and plant collector.
- Leandro Campanari, Italian-American violinist, conductor, composer and music teacher.
- Angus Cloud (1998–2023), actor
- Herbert A. Collins, landscape and portrait artist
- Irving Morrow, architect
- Ina Coolbrith (1841–1928), California's first poet laureate
- Margaret Girvin Gillin (1833–1915), painter
- Andre Hicks (aka. Mac Dre), Bay Area rapper, record label owner, and producer
- Thomas Hill, artist
- William Keith (1838–1911), California landscape artist
- Bernard Maybeck, architect
- Julia Morgan (1872–1957), architect
- Frank Norris (1870-1902), author
- Irving Pichel (1891-1954), American actor and film director
- Floyd Salas (1931–2021), author
- Margaret Singer (1921-2003), researcher
- Isabel Seal Stovel, organizers of the City of San Francisco Music Week
- Bella French Swisher (1837–1893), writer
- Douglas Tilden (1860–1935), sculptor

=== Local history ===
- David Douty Colton, vice president of the Southern Pacific Railroad, namesake of the city of Colton, California
- Henry Durant, first president of the University of California, Berkeley
- Nannie S. Brown Kramer (1883–1953), organizer, president and membership director of the Oakland Women's City Club
- Virginia Prentiss, African-American midwife and nanny to Jack London
- Jane K. Sather, donor of Sather Gate and Sather Tower to the University of California, Berkeley
- Francis K. Shattuck, prominent in the politics and early development of Alameda County, Oakland and Berkeley
- William T. Shorey, African-American whaling captain and Oakland civic leader
- John Swett, founder of the California Public School System
- Charles Lee Tilden, namesake of Tilden Regional Park

=== Other ===
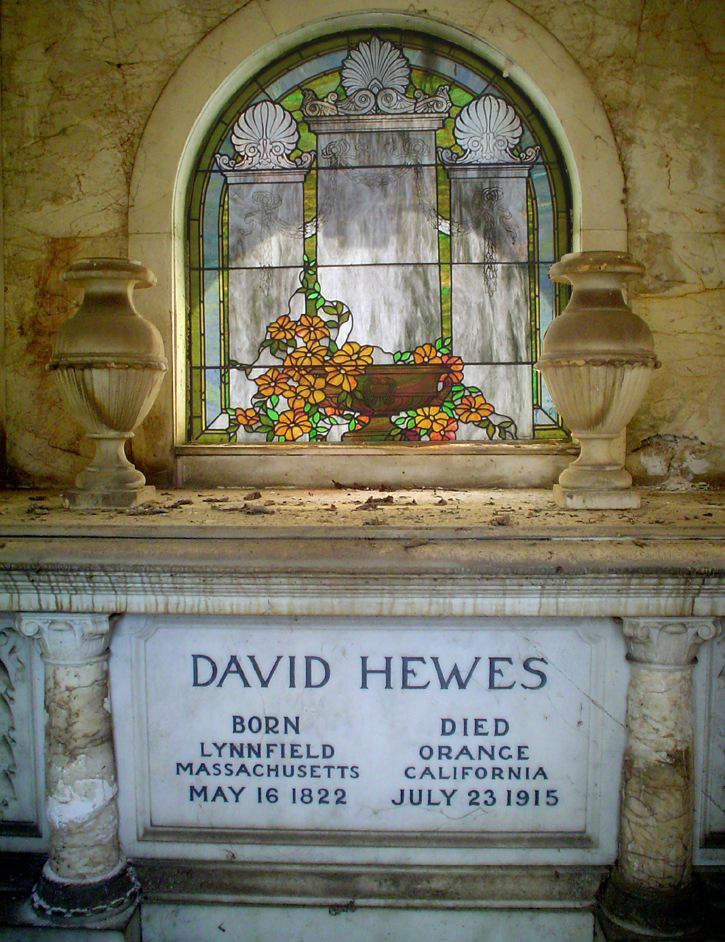
David Hewes burial vault

- Volney V. Ashford, exiled revolutionary
- Cloe Annette Buckel, one of the first female doctors in California
- Glenn Burke (1952–1995), first openly gay player in Major League Baseball
- Henry D. Cogswell, dentist and temperance movement crusader
- Marcus Foster, first Black Superintendent of the Oakland Unified School District in Oakland, California, first victim of the Symbionese Liberation Army
- Eliza Nelson Fryer, educator and missionary
- David Hewes, who provided the "Golden Spike"
- Bobby Hutton, first treasurer of the Black Panther Party
- Fred Korematsu, challenged Executive Order 9066 in the landmark Supreme Court case Korematsu v. United States
- Ike Lassiter, football player
- Joseph LeConte, co-founder of the Sierra Club
- Ernie Lombardi, Hall of Fame Major League Baseball player
- Washington J. Oglesby (1859–1902), was an African-American lawyer, one of the earliest in the State of California
- John Norton Pomeroy, law professor at Hastings College of the Law
- Elizabeth Short, unsolved Hollywood murder victim known as the Black Dahlia
- There is one British Commonwealth war grave, of Pilot Officer James Raymond Lippi, an American born member of the Royal Canadian Air Force, who died in 1942. Lippi was born in Santa Cruz, California and went to Canada to enlist for World War II
- Lee Ya-Ching, China's First Lady of Flight, first female pilot graduated from Geneve-Cointrin (Switzerland) and from Boeing School of Aeronautics.

== In popular culture ==
Mountain View Cemetery is featured prominently in the 2018 film Blindspotting. Daveed Diggs's character is shown going there for morning runs, and an important scene happens in the cemetery where the character imagines Black victims of police brutality standing over the graves.

In The Big Wake-Up, a 2009 crime novel by Mark Coggins, the main character in the book, a detective named August Riordan, discovers that Argentine first lady Eva Perón is not at rest in the Duarte family tomb in La Recoleta Cemetery, Buenos Aires, but is actually buried in Mountain View Cemetery.

Mountain View Cemetery is featured on the album cover for Green Day’s debut album 39/Smooth and the band’s compilation album, 1,039/Smoothed Out Slappy Hours.
