= Sue Ko Lee =

Labor organizer (1910–1996)

Sue Ko Lee was a Chinese American labor activist and labor organizer based in California. She is known as a leader of International Ladies' Garment Workers' Union (ILGWU) in California and a participant of a strike against National Dollar Stores garment factory in 1938, which was the beginning of Chinese women fighting for higher wages and better working conditions in the Chinatown garment industry.

== Personal life ==
Born in Honolulu, Hawaii, Sue Ko Lee grew up in Watsonville, California as the oldest of 10 children. She married Lee Jew Hing, a Chinese migrant who also worked at National Dollar Stores, and they had two children, Mervyn and Stanley. On May 15, 1996, Sue Ko died at the age of 86 in El Cerrito, California.

== Career ==
Lee worked as a buttonhole machine operator at National Dollar Stores factory, owned by Chinese American businessman, Joe Shoong. Due to the factory's poor working conditions such as wages below minimum wage, Lee and other workers voted to join Local 341 of the Chinese Ladies' Garment Workers Union (ILGWU) in 1938. When Shoong refused to recognize the union and attempted to sell the factory, Lee and other workers went on a 105-day strike, which at the time was the longest strike in the history of San Francisco's Chinatown. During the strike, Lee and the other women workers actively walked picket lines, organized picketing schedules, and spoke out at union meetings. The strike ended when Shoong agreed to a 5% raise, $14/week, a 40-hour workweek, vacations, and overtime pay. Shoong subsequently closed down his factory one year later. Lee viewed the 1938 strike as an important change in the way Chinese American women banded together to challenge unfair labor practices in the Chinatown garment industry.

Lee credited the union with helping her and her husband find jobs outside of Chinatown in white garment factories; Lee worked as a machine operator and her husband found work as a cutter after Shoong shut down his factory. In the 1950s, Lee became a staff member at Local 101 of the ILGWU. Lee later became the first Chinese American business agent in the garment worker union. After 20 years as a union organizer, Lee worked for the state of California in employment services and retired in 1975.
