= Zedekiah Johnson Purnell =

African American activist, businessman (1813–1882)

- Born: c. 1813; Philadelphia, Pennsylvania, U.S.
- Died: November 12, 1882; California, U.S.
- Burial place: Mountain View Cemetery, Oakland, California, U.S.
- Other names: Zedkiah J. Purnell, Z. J. Purnell
- Movement: Colored Conventions Movement
- Spouse: Ann Sammons

Zedekiah Johnson Purnell (c. 1813–1882) was an African-American activist, businessman, and editor. He served as the editor of the literary journal The Demosthenian Shield. In the 1840s, Purnell emerged on the national stage as an outspoken proponent of an African-American press, supporting such authors as Charles Bennett Ray and Samuel Cornish.

== Early life ==
Zedekiah Johnson Purnell was born in about 1813 in Philadelphia, Pennsylvania. His family was active Philadelphia's black community.

He began early work in 1833 as a sailor, but eventually changed careers in hopes for finding more stability.

== Career ==
Purnell became a hairdresser and successful business-owner, his salon was located on the corner of Carpenter and Decatur Streets in Philadelphia.

Purnell began his work as a "champion of the black press" in 1839 when he helped to found an organization that would become known as the Demosthenian Institute, "a literary society of colored young men". He was an avid supporter of Samuel Cornish and Charles B. Ray's Colored American and Martin R. Delany's Mystery.

On August 23, 1841, Purnell attended the Pennsylvania State Convention of Colored Freemen in Pittsburgh.

As of the 1860 Philadelphia Census, his real estate property was valued at approximately US$1100 and his personal estate was valued at US$400. The family eventually moved to the San Francisco Bay Area continuing their civil rights activism, and first settling in San Jose, later moving to Oakland, California. In 1877, he ran for city council of Oakland (serving the 6th ward).

Purnell died on November 12, 1882, in California, and is buried in Mountain View Cemetery in Oakland.

== Personal life ==
Purnell married Ann Sammons. They had one daughter.

Purnell and both were listed as members of the African Episcopal Church of St. Thomas, a church of the black elite in Philadelphia.
