= William T. Shorey =

19th-century American whaling ship captain

- Born: July 13, 1859; Barbados, West Indies
- Died: April 15, 1919 (aged 59); Oakland, California, U.S.
- Occupation: Ship Captain
- Spouse: Julia Ann Shelton
- Children: Zenobia Pearl Shorey, Victoria Grace Shorey, William T. Shorey Jr

William T. Shorey (July 13, 1859 – April 15, 1919) was a late 19th-century American whaling ship captain known to his crew as the Black Ahab. He was born in Barbados July 13, 1859. He was of African descent through Barbados. Spent his life at sea. He became the only Black captain operating on the west coast of the United States in the late-1880s and 1890s. The John and Winthrop was the only whaling ship in the world to be manned entirely by an African-American crew.

== Early life ==
Shorey was born on January 25, 1859 on the Caribbean Island of Barbados. His father was Scottish and planted sugar and his mother was creole, or West Indian. Even though slavery had ended on the island, there were limited opportunities for "men of color". Shorey was attracted to sea-life and adventure, and seized the opportunity to leave the island on board a ship bound for Boston. Through his relationship with the Captain on charge of the ship, he learned how to sail and navigate ocean waters. He began work as on a whaler sometime in the 1870s. He was the son of a Scottish sugar planter and was a West Indian Women of mixed African and European ancestry. In 1875 he shipped to Boston, Massachusetts as a cabin boy and in the following year made his maiden voyage on a whaler. He was learning navigation and moving up rapidly through the ranks.

== Career ==
He obtained his certification in 1885. Shorey came to San Francisco, California on the whaler Emma F. Herr. His whaling voyages were based out of San Francisco on the whaling ships Emma F. Herriman, Alexander, Andrew Hicks, Gay Head II, and John and Winthrop. Shorey was often a captain of a multi-racial crew. Shorey retired from whaling in 1908 and lived in Oakland, where he became a civic leader, until his death from the Spanish flu pandemic in 1919. He is buried at Mountain View Cemetery in Oakland, California. In his obituary, he was remembered as someone "who for thirty years was in charge of sailing vessels engaged in whaling in Alaska."
