= Isabel Seal Stovel =

American music educator (1882–1960)

- Born: May 25, 1882; Oakland, California, U.S.
- Died: November 29, 1960 (aged 78); San Francisco, California, U.S.
- Burial place: Mountain View Cemetery
- Occupations: Violinist; music educator
- Employers: Dominican College; San Francisco Civic Association; Pro-Musica Inc.
- Spouse: Hubert Roy Stovel (m. 1906)

Isabel Seal Stovel (May 25, 1882 – November 29, 1960) was an American music educator and one of organizers of the City of San Francisco Music Week.

== Early life ==
Stovel was born on May 25, 1882, in Oakland, California, the daughter of the florist Jessie Livingstone Cobbledick and Alfred Blake Seal.

== Career ==
Stovel spent three years in travel and study, then becoming a musician and teacher of violin. From 1914 to 1918, she worked for the Violin Department at the Oakland Settlement, in Oakland, California. Starting from 1922, she worked for the Violin Department at the Dominican College in San Rafael, California.

She was the secretary of the San Francisco Civic Association for Maintaining Welfare and Recreation Work in the Army and Navy hospitals, prisons, and other institutions. She was the secretary and one of organizers of the City of San Francisco Music Week, which became a national movement.

She was the treasurer of the San Francisco Chapter of Pro-Musica Inc. for the Advancement of Modern Music.

She was a member of the Pacific Musical Society, the San Francisco Musical Club, the San Francisco Music Teachers Association, and the League of Business and Professional Women.

== Personal life ==
Stovel moved to San Francisco in 1903 and lived at 607 Third Ave., San Francisco, California. On January 31, 1906, she married Hubert Roy Stovel.

She died on November 29, 1960, and was buried at Mountain View Cemetery (Oakland, California).
