= Margaret Girvin Gillin =

Canadian-born American painter (1833–1915)

- Born: Margaret Girvin; 17 September 1833; Brantford, Ontario, Canada
- Died: 21 January 1915 (aged 81); Oakland, California, United States
- Burial place: Mountain View Cemetery, Oakland, California, United States
- Education: California School of Design
- Occupation: Painter

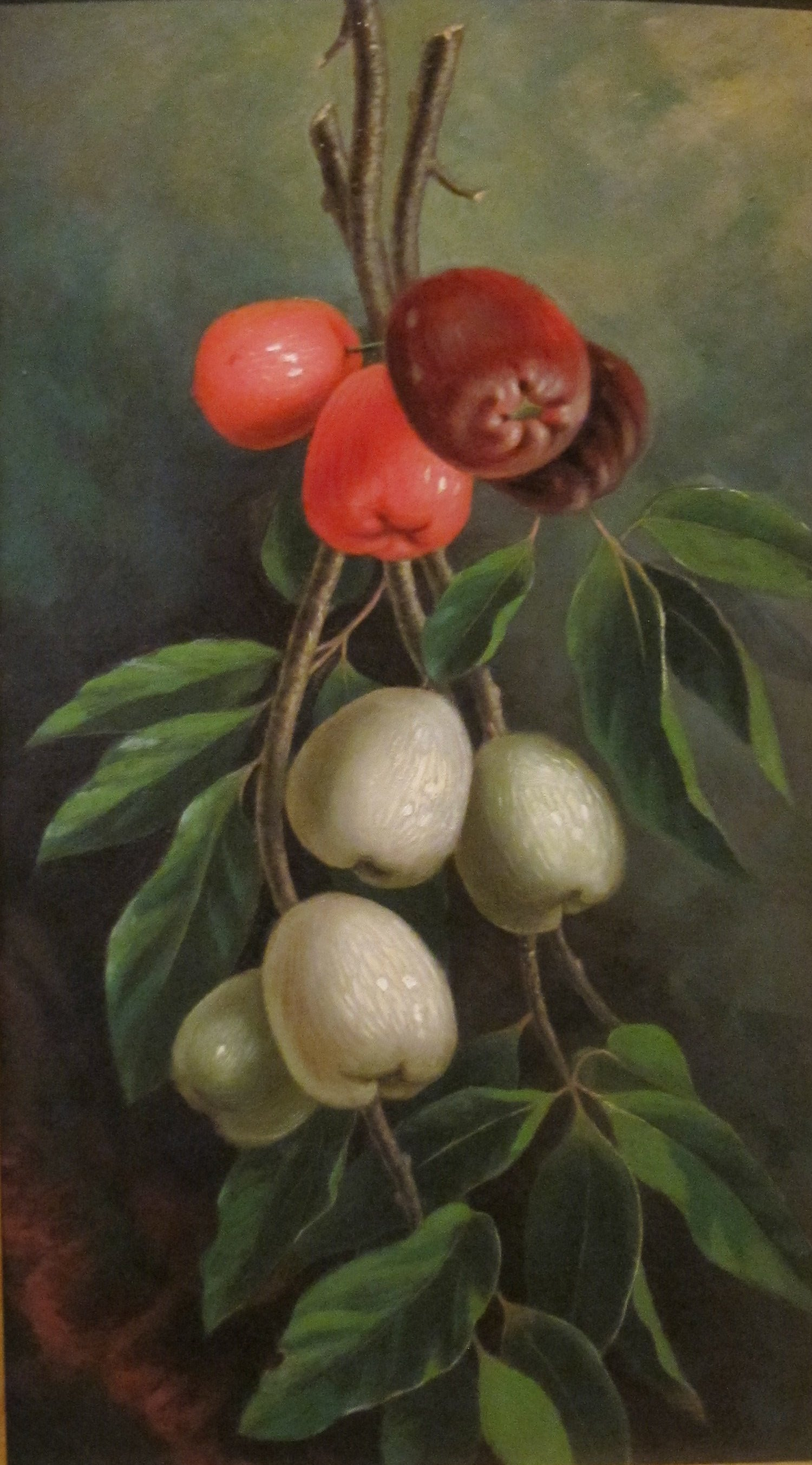
'Ōhi'a 'ai (c. 1880)

Margaret Girvin Gillin (1833–1915), also known as Margarete Garvin Gillin, was a Canadian painter of portraits and still lifes. She was active in Northern California and Hawaii.

== Biography ==
Margaret Girvin Gillin was born in 1833, in Brantford, Upper Canada. Her younger brother James Walter Girvin (1844–1906) was a writer, librarian, and he owned mercantile stores in Hawaii.

She studied painting in France, and moved to California in 1869, where she continued her studies at the California School of Design (later known as the San Francisco Art Institute). In 1880, she moved to Hilo, Hawaii, but traveled to Hawaii's other islands to paint commissioned portraits. She returned to California in 1884, but made several more visits to Hawaii. She died in Oakland, California on 21 January 1915.

Gillin is best known for her simple, elegant and direct still lifes. The Bishop Museum in Honolulu is among the public collections holding her works.
