= Jessie L. Seal =

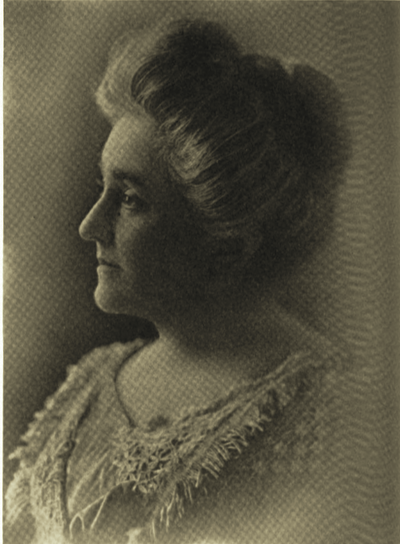
- Jessie L. Seal, in a 1926 publication.
- Born: Jessie Livingstone Cobbledick; February 3, 1864; California, U.S.
- Died: July 5, 1946 (aged 82); San Francisco, California, U.S.
- Occupation: floriculturist
- Known for: Dahlia business
- Spouse: Alfred Blake Seal (d. 1913)
- Children: 2, including Isabel Seal Stovel
- Relatives: Samuel Newsom (cousin)

Signature
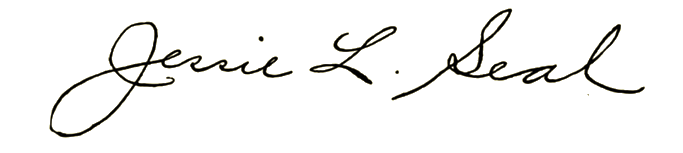

Jessie L. Seal (1864–1946) was an American floriculturist. An authority on the culture of dahlias, she turned a hobby into a profitable floristry business.

== Early life ==
Jessie Livingstone Cobbledick was born in California, February 3, 1864. She was a member of the Cobbledick family of San Francisco.

== Career ==
For a number of years, Seal grew dahlias with great success in the yard of her San Francisco home. In 1915, there were growing in her San Francisco backyard a few choice dahlia plants which had exotic blooms under her care. One day, while wandering through the Palace of Horticulture at the Panama Pacific Exposition, she noticed a table that was bare and asked if she might not bring a bouquet of dahlias to show the world what beautiful types California could produce. this granted, easterns and foreign visitors noticed the beautiful blooms and inquired as to what they were as they were accustomed to dahlias being the small, tight-petaled ones.

They inquired if Seal would take orders for tubers in their season. This idea had never entered her head, as she had no stock on hand, but she was quick to grasp the opportunity and in a few weeks, had taken order for US$600 worth of tubers which she had to buy to fill.

Then an inspiration came to her: she leased the huge vacant lot next to her home for a nominal rent. She planted only the best of tubers, importing many from the foreign firms of which exposition visitors had told her. Any that did not run true to t ype were discarded, because if a dahlia does not run true, the tubers that it throws out will not run true. It was not long before the vacant lot next to the Seal home was transformed into a place of beauty. An artistic fence and gate enclosed it from the street and narrow brick walks threaded between the beds.

Between the dahlia rows were trellises of sweet peas, grown for the market, and which acted as a windbreak to the dahlias, protecting the young plants from strong city breezes until they had grown self-reliant and sturdy. On the very edges of the walks, too close for the dahlias to find root, there were borders of beets, lettuce, and carrots. Stored away in the cellar were boxes of potatoes which had grown in all the corners.

Seal's dahlia business had developed to such proportions in four years that her one small garden could not raise all the tubers she shipped away. So Seal created twelve dahlia gardens in different parts of San Francisco, growing new tubers as they could be cultivated under almost all conditions.

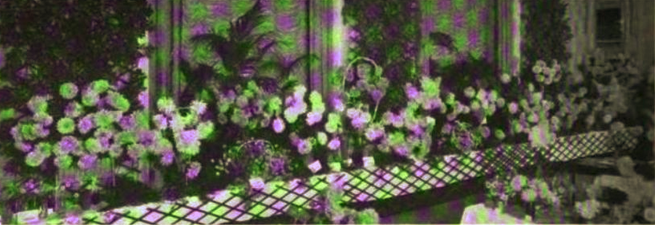
Seal's exhibit at the 1927 dahlia show at the Palace Hotel, San Francisco

She subsequently developed a business requiring many acres and a complete organization of assistants in the growing, handling and marketing of her product. She owned and managed a dahlia nursery farm which produced and shipped the dahlia tubers to practically every region where these flowers were cultivated and admired. Seal shipped them to locales running the gamut of extremes in climate from Mexico to Alaska, Honolulu, and China. Her office was located at 607 Third Avenue, San Francisco. Her dahlia farm was situated in Napa County, California, where she also owned a home. Associated as a partner in the business was her nephew, Samuel Newsom, a son of the California architect, Samuel Newsom.

In autumn 1926, Seal stumbled and broke her leg and spent some weeks in a hospital. During her recuperation, Newsom took on extra responsibilities. As her health declined, Seal sold her business to the nephew, but after recovery, she began planning another garden, this time in San Mateo County, assisted by her son-in law, Roy Stovall. In 1928, she announced that she had her land piped for overhead sprinkling and that she used this method exclusively as there were many advantages to this method including that the plants were frequently washed, the soil did not pack, and a good growth was attained.

Becoming an authority for dahlia culture on the West coast, she published a detailed catalogue each year and acted as an introducer for new varieties which amateur growers would bring to high quality.

She was prominent as one of the organizers and directors of the Dahlia Society of California.

== Personal life ==
She married Alfred Blake Seal, who died August 13, 1913. Ror many years, he was engaged in the tuna canning business at San Pedro, California. The couple had two children, a daughter, Isabel Seal Stovel, and a son, Alfred Henry Seal.

Jessie Seal died in San Francisco, July 5, 1946.

== Awards and honors ==
By 1919, she was the winner of 71 prizes in the annual dahlia exhibitions in San Francisco. She had been growing dahlias commercially for only one year when in 1916, she was the winner of the silver trophy cup given by the society for the best general collection of dahlias at their first exhibition in San Francisco.

== Selected works ==
- Dahlias, 1922
- Jessie L. Seal, specializing in dahlia and delphinium seeds, 1930 (bulletin and price list)
- Dahlias, 1935
