= Henry T. Johns =

American Civil War Medal of Honor recipient (1828–1906)

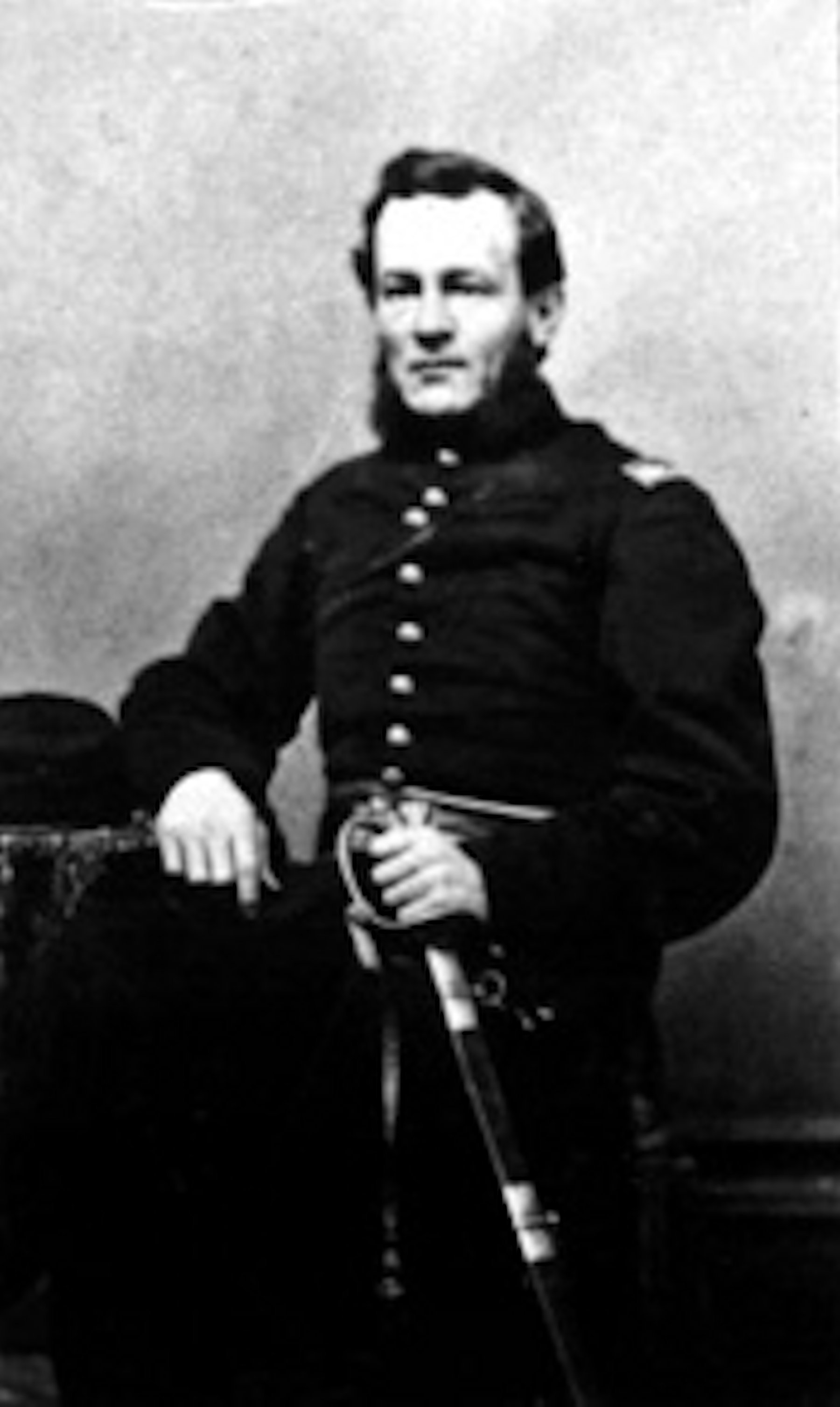
- Born: April 8, 1828; Philadelphia, Pennsylvania
- Died: May 13, 1906 (aged 78)
- Burial place: Mountain View Cemetery, Oakland, California
- Military career
- Allegiance: United States
- Branch: United States Army
- Service years: 1862 - 1863, 1864 - 1865
- Rank: First Lieutenant
- Units: Company C, 49th Massachusetts Infantry Regiment
- Conflicts: American Civil War
- Awards: Medal of Honor

Henry T. Johns (April 8, 1828 - May 13, 1906) was a Union Army soldier in the American Civil War who received the U.S. military's highest decoration, the Medal of Honor.

Johns was born in Philadelphia on April 8, 1828. He joined the 49th Massachusetts Infantry from Hinsdale, Massachusetts in September 1862, and mustered out with this regiment one year later. He was commissioned as an officer of the 61st Massachusetts Infantry in September 1864, and mustered out with this regiment in June 1865.

Johns was awarded the Medal of Honor, for extraordinary heroism on May 27, 1863, while serving as a Private with Company C, 49th Massachusetts Infantry Regiment, at Port Hudson, Louisiana. His Medal of Honor was issued on November 25, 1893. He died at the age of 78, on May 13, 1906, and was buried at the Mountain View Cemetery in Oakland, California.

== Medal of Honor citation ==
The President of the United States of America, in the name of Congress, takes pleasure in presenting the Medal of Honor to Private Henry T. Johns, United States Army, for extraordinary heroism on 27 May 1863, while serving with Company C, 49th Massachusetts Infantry, in action at Port Hudson, Louisiana. Private Johns volunteered in response to a call and took part in the movement that was made upon the enemy's works under a heavy fire there from in advance of the general assault.
