= National Dollar Stores =

Defunct retail chain

National Dollar Stores, Ltd. (Chinese: 中興公司, often romanized as Chung Hing), formerly known as China Toggery and Sang Lee Dry Goods, was a Chinese American-owned dry goods store chain that operated primarily in the western United States from 1903 to 1996. Co-founded by Joe Shoong (a Chinese-American businessperson and philanthropist) in 1901, who bought out his three business partners in 1903, and incorporated in 1921, the National Dollar Stores were the first retail chain on the West Coast and one of the largest Chinese American-owned retail chains in U.S. history.

The chain was originally named China Toggery, or Chung Hing (中兴), meaning “revival” or “resurgence” of China in Chinese. The store was headquartered in San Francisco at 927-929 Market Street from 1905. In 1928, Shoong changed the name from China Toggery to the National Dollar Store.

According to an article in SFGATE, the store's customers were mostly “low-income people, often minorities.” By 1959, there were 54 National Dollar Stores in six western states, employing approximately 700 workers. The stores sold clothing and small household goods, with the aim of offering quality merchandise at affordable prices.

== Store managers ==
According to a 1938 article in Time magazine, the “main thing that distinguishes [the National Dollar Stores] from competitors like J. C. Penney Co. is that they are entirely run and largely owned by Chinese,” while about 90% of the retail clerks were Caucasian. The majority of the first-generation managers and assistant managers at the National Dollar Stores were related to Shoong and came from his hometown of Long Tau Wan or his home district of Long Du in Zhongshan, Guangdong. Shoong provided the managers with a house with all utilities paid, a competitive annual salary, a percentage of the profits from the store that they managed, and he paid for the education of many of the managers' children.

== Manufacturing and the 1938 strike ==
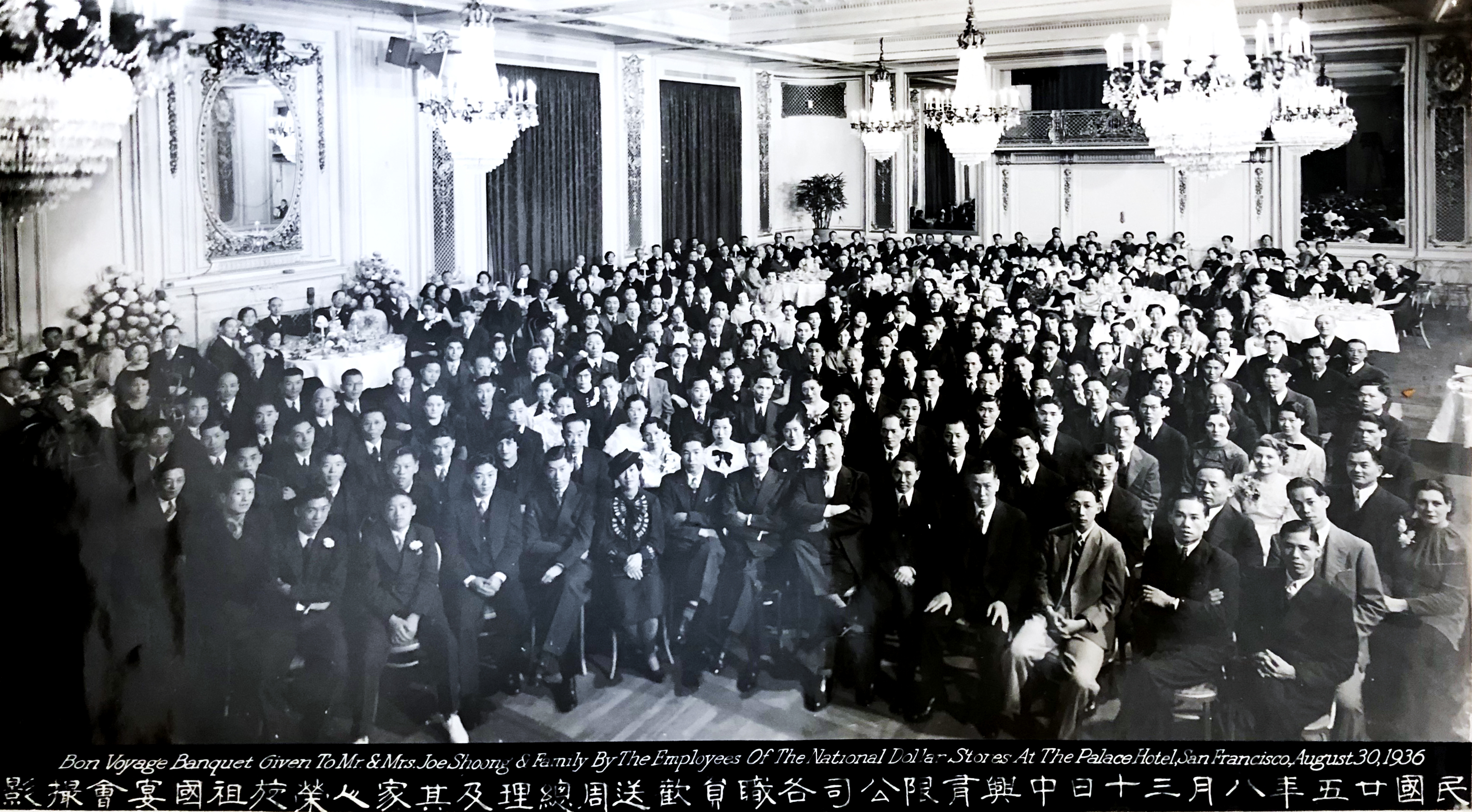
1936 Bon Voyage Banquet for Mr & Mrs Joe Shoong & family

As a strategy for keeping prices low, Shoong had most of the stores’ merchandise manufactured in a company-owned factory in San Francisco's Chinatown rather than importing goods from outside of the U.S. In an interview for the Oakland Tribune in 1924, Shoong explained, “From manufacturer direct to the consumer, is the plan...This plan we know makes lower prices on dependable and fashionable merchandise for our patrons.”

In 1937, Chinese workers at the National Dollar Store garment factory such as Sue Ko Lee organized with the International Ladies Garment Workers Union (ILGWU) to form the Chinese Ladies’ Garment Workers’ Union (LGWU) Local 341. The Chinese LGWU demanded a union contract, a wage increase to $20 (~$229.00 in 2025) per 35 hour week, recognition of the union, a union shop, a union label, and better working conditions from the National Dollar Store factory managers.

On February 8, 1938, Shoong sold the factory to Golden Gate Manufacturing, a company run by the factory manager and a former National Dollar Store employee. The ILGWU viewed this move as an attempt to break the union, and on February 26, 1938, one hundred and eight workers went on strike, picketing the factory and its three retail store locations. After 13 weeks of picketing, the owner of Golden Gate Manufacturing finally negotiated with the workers. As a result of the strike, the factory workers won a 5% raise, a 40 hour work week, enforcement of health, fire, and sanitary conditions, and guaranteed employment for at least 11 months of the year. However, the National Dollar Stores started purchasing merchandise elsewhere and in 1939, Golden Gate Manufacturing went out of business, leaving many employees jobless.

== "National" name change and store closure ==
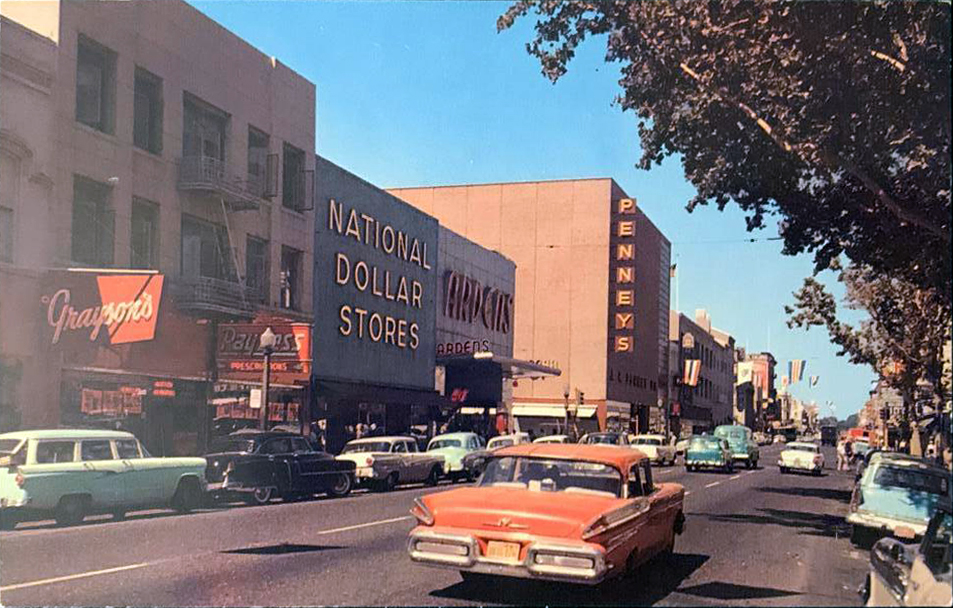
Postcard of K Street, Sacramento CA

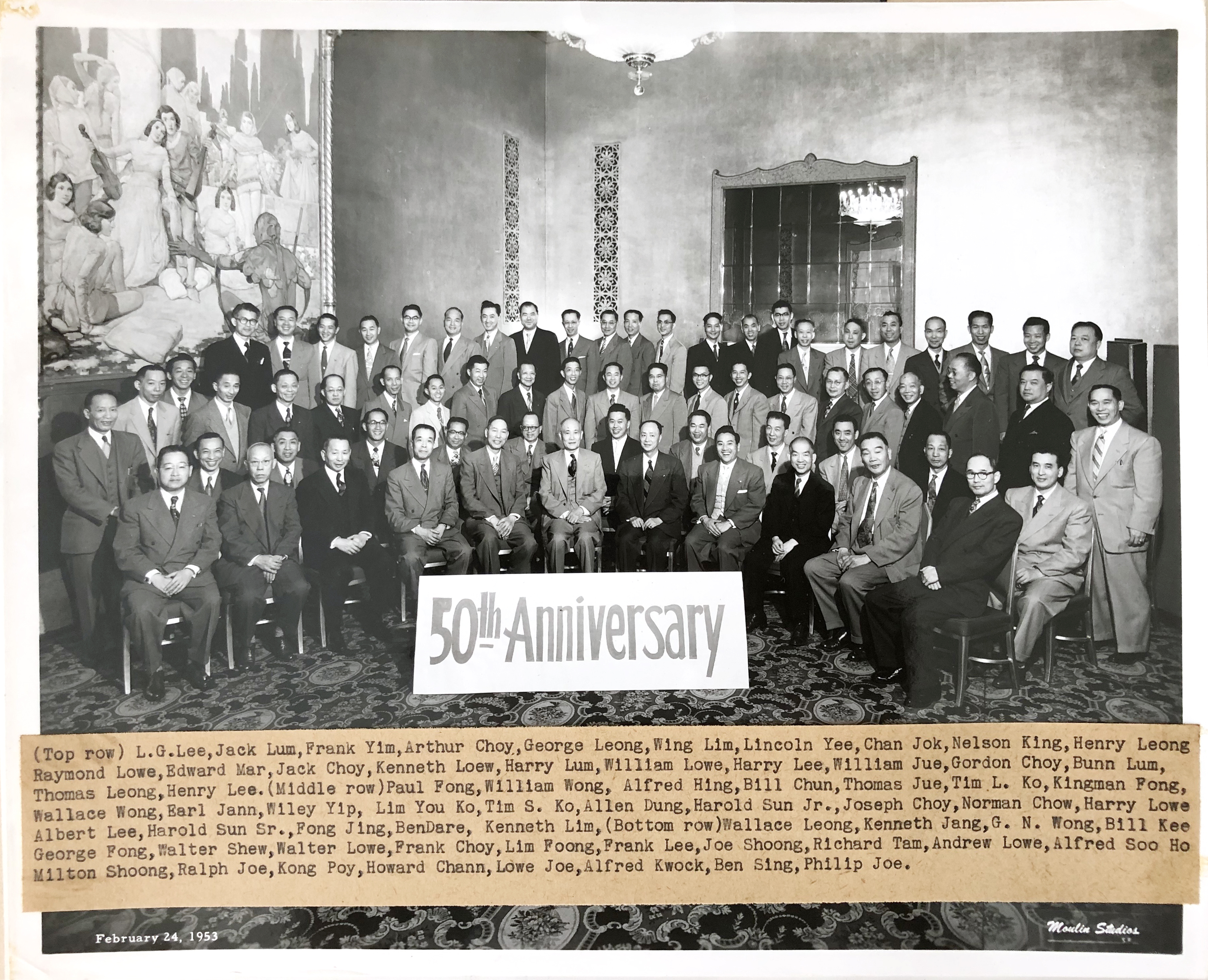
National Dollar Stores 50th anniversary group photo

At some point between 1965 and 1970, Milton Shoong, Joe Shoong’s son who became the chain’s president after his father’s passing in 1961, changed the name of the chain from "National Dollar Stores" to "National".

In 1989, the San Francisco earthquake damaged 2 stores that then required major remodeling. By the 1990s, the National Dollar Stores were struggling with the recession and damages to some of the 11 Los Angeles-area stores from the 1992 Los Angeles riots.

Robert Kahn, a management consultant, commented in 1996 that the stores were “an archaic type of operation...I don’t think they’ve done a remodel in 30 years,” and that they had “square counters, with reserve stock underneath. Signs in the middle of the table give the price. That's not the way we do merchandising today.”

On February 15, 1996, ninety-three years after its inception, the National Dollar Stores chain closed doors on its 27 remaining stores, and about 400 employees lost their jobs.

== Store Locations ==
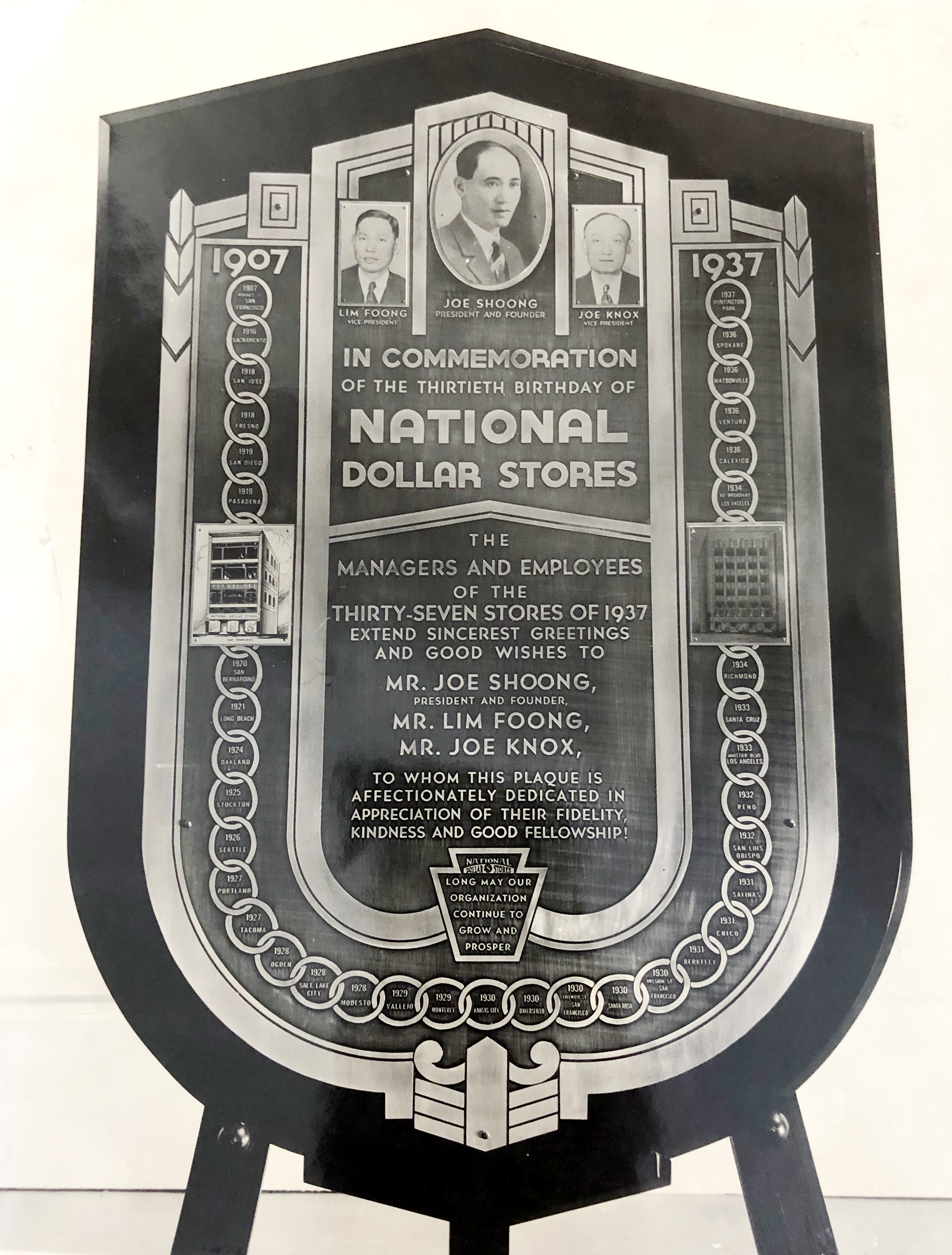
National Dollar Stores thirtieth birthday plaque

These are listed in order of the year each store was opened. If known, the year of a store's closing has been added.

- 1901-1903: Vallejo, CA (Sang Lee Dry Goods)
- 1903-1905: San Francisco, CA, Fillmore Street (Sang Lee Dry Goods)
- 1905: San Francisco, CA, Market Street
- 1916: Sacramento, CA
- 1918: San Jose, CA
- 1918: Fresno, CA
- 1919: Pasadena, CA
- 1919: San Diego, CA
- 1920: San Bernardino, CA
- 1921: Long Beach, CA
- 1924: Oakland, CA
- 1925: Stockton, CA
- 1926: Seattle, WA
- 1927: Portland, OR
- 1927: Tacoma, WA
- by 1928: Honolulu, HI
- by 1928: Nevada
- 1928: Ogden, UT
- 1928: Salt Lake City, UT
- 1928: Modesto, CA
- 1929: Monterey, CA
- 1929: Vallejo, CA: 433 Georgia Street
- 1930: Bakersfield, CA
- 1930: Kansas City, MO
- 1930: San Francisco, CA, Fillmore Street
- 1930: San Francisco, CA, Mission Street
- 1930: Santa Rosa, CA
- 1931: Berkeley, CA
- 1931: Chico, CA
- 1931: Salinas, CA
- 1932: Reno, NV
- 1932: San Luis Obispo, CA
- 1933: Los Angeles, CA, Whittier Boulevard
- 1933: Santa Cruz, CA
- 1934: Los Angeles, CA, South Broadway
- 1934: Richmond, CA
- 1936: Calexico, CA
- 1936: Spokane, WA
- 1936: Ventura, CA
- 1936: Watsonville, CA
- 1937: Huntington Park, CA
- by 1946: Marysville, CA
- by 1946: Pittsburg, CA
- by 1946: Pomona, CA
- by 1946: Los Angeles, CA (3 locations total)
- by 1946: San Francisco, CA (third location)
- likely after 1946: Oakland, CA (second location)
- 1949: Honolulu, HI, Waialae Avenue
- 1951-1996: Maui, HI
- 1962-1983: San Francisco, CA, Stockton Street
- 1983: San Francisco, CA, Broadway
- by 1983: Arizona
- by 1983: Texas
