= Joe Shoong =

Chinese-American businessman and philanthropist

Joe Shoong (30 August 1879 – 13 April 1961) was a Chinese American businessman and philanthropist who founded the National Dollar Stores and supported many Chinese organizations. He was one of the first Chinese American millionaires and at one time, according to Time Magazine, was the "richest, best-known Chinese business man in the U.S." Though the National Dollar Stores are now closed, Shoong's legacy endures through the organizations, including cultural centers, schools and universities, which he and the Shoong Foundation supported.

== Name ==
Joe Shoong was born as Zhou Song (Chinese: 周崧). Due to the Chinese usage of placing the family name first, Shoong's names were transposed when he emigrated to the U.S. and his given name, Song (changed slightly to Shoong), became the family name he used in America. Song means "big and tall mountain".

== Early years ==
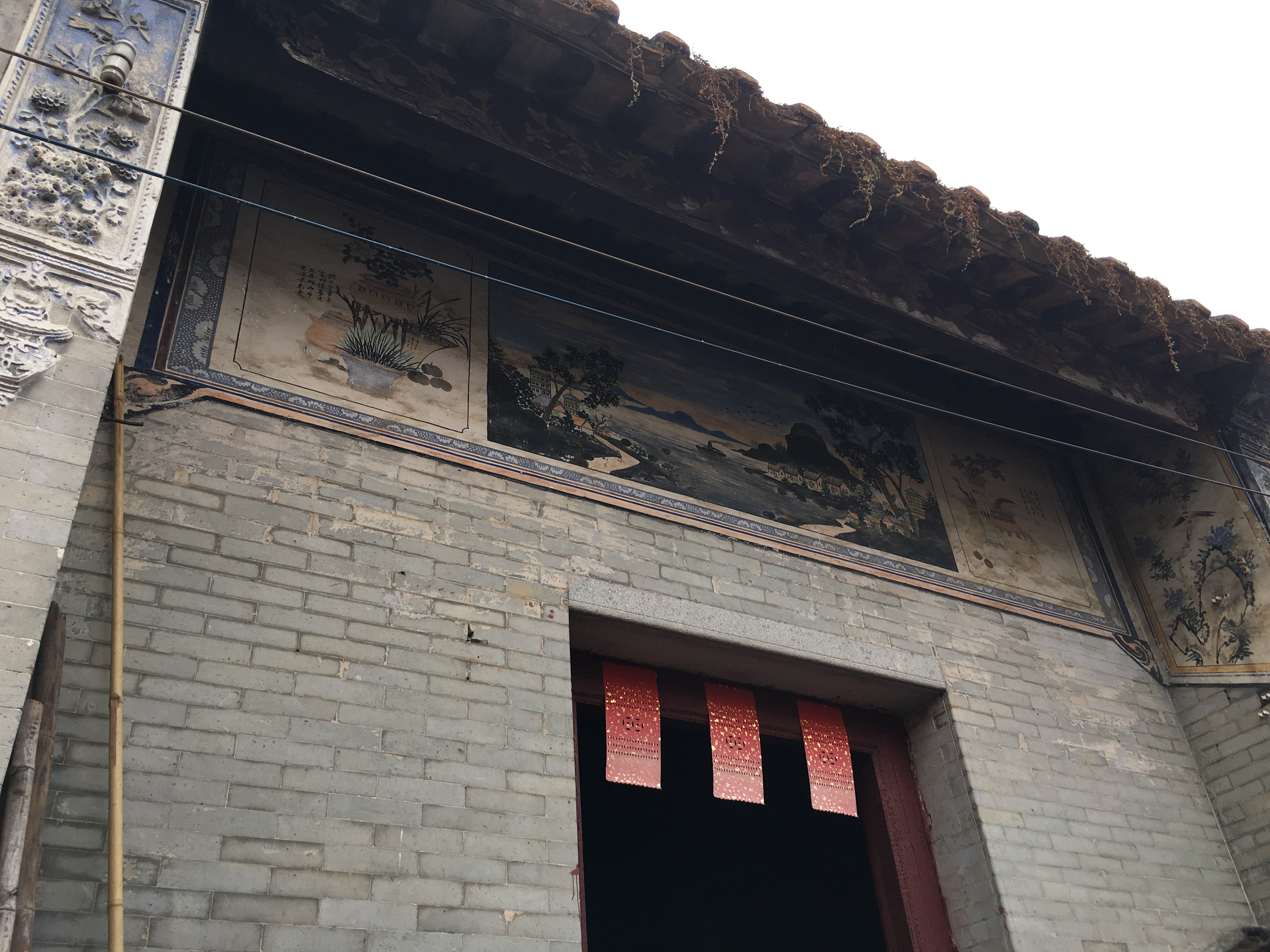
Joe Shoong's childhood home in Long Tau Wan, China

Shoong was born to Joe Gon Lim and Chew Wong Shee in the village of Long Tau Wan (simplified Chinese: 龙头环; traditional Chinese: 龍頭環) in Zhongshan, Guangdong, China. In that village, the Long Du dialect was spoken so that is most likely the dialect spoken by Shoong. Long Du speakers can generally understand Cantonese.

According to his daughter Doris, Shoong sold eggs in China when he was young, and emigrated to the United States when he was 18 or 19 years old (1897 or 1898), without any relatives. From 1882, the Chinese Exclusion Act was in force, allowing only three categories of Chinese immigrants to America: merchants, students and diplomats.

Shoong's first place of residence in America was Vallejo, California, where he lived with friends and relatives from Long Tau Wan and worked in a garment factory.

== National Dollar Stores ==
In 1901, Shoong opened a store in Vallejo called Sang Lee Dry Goods together with Hon Chui Choy, Doh DohWing and a fourth unknown person. Two years later, he bought out his partners and moved the store to Fillmore Street in San Francisco. In 1905, he changed the name to China Toggery, or Chung Hing in Chinese, meaning "revival" or "rejuvenation", and moved the headquarters to 927-929 Market Street. The stores sold clothes and household goods: quality merchandise offered at low prices.

Shoong changed the name to the National Dollar Stores in 1928, when there were sixteen store locations in the West, in cities such as Sacramento, Seattle, and Portland.

The National Dollar Stores were unusual because the majority ownership and all management was Chinese, and about 90% of the clerks were Caucasian. Shoong helped a great number of Chinese people, many from his own Long Du district, come to America and provided them and their families with housing and education.

In 1938, the National Dollar Stores were part of a labor dispute in which the International Ladies' Garment Workers' Union picketed three San Francisco stores and a factory supplying the stores. Subsequently, Shoong filed for $500,000 damages and the suit was settled, though the factory then went out of business.

Covering Hawaii and seven western states, by 1959 there were fifty-four stores worth $12 million, with 700 employees.

After Shoong's death in 1961, the store leadership was taken over by his son, Milton, and the chain went into slow decline. The stores were hurt by the recession of the early 1990s, competition from national discount chains, and the 1992 Los Angeles riots in which eleven stores were damaged. In February 1996, ninety-five years after the opening of Shoong's first store, the National Dollar Stores closed.

== Other business interests ==
Shoong invested in real estate and in the stock market, and kept a ticker tape in his bedroom. Just before the Wall Street crash of 1929, Shoong was traveling across the country by train and had a premonition to sell all of his portfolio. At each train stop, he ordered his broker to sell off his stock, and in the end he received a check from the Bank of America for his portfolio value of a million dollars

Around 1926, Shoong bought 51% of the stock of the National Shoe Company, thus acquiring a controlling interest in Reeves Shoe Stores, a chain of 32 shops on the West Coast.

The New York Times included Shoong in a 1938 article on the highest salaries across the nation. The list was topped by movie producer Louis B. Mayer with his compensation of $1,296,503. The California section shows Shoong earning $75,749 with the National Dollar Stores, and a "Joe Schoong" receiving $50,030 from "Schoong Investment Company". There was a Shoong Investment Company and this is most likely an typographical error. Other notable names in California included William Randolph Hearst ($500,000 income), Charles Chaplin ($106,000) and Walter E. Disney ($39,750).

== Political views and affiliations ==
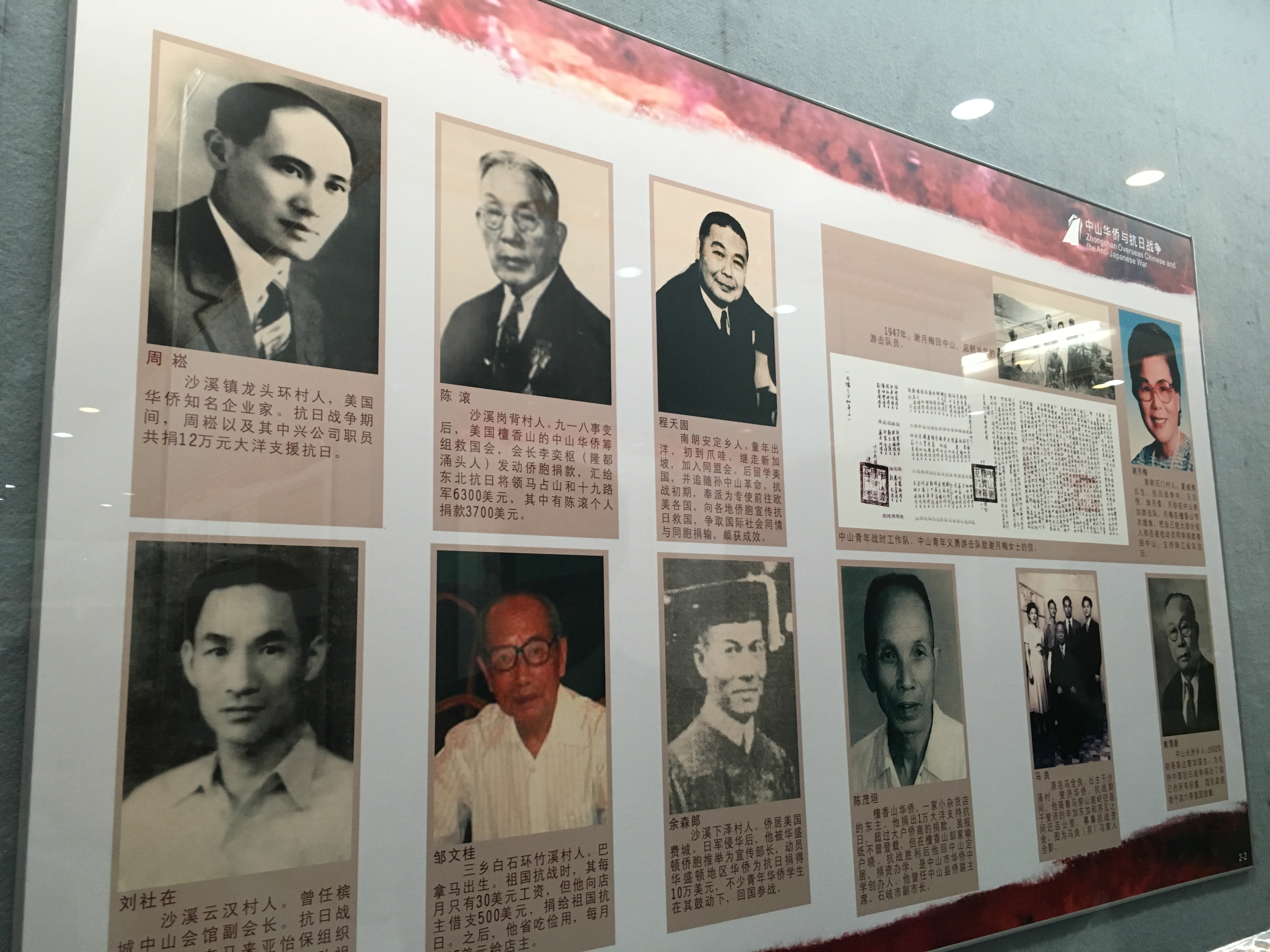
Poster at Zhongshan Museum featuring Joe Shoong (top left)

Like many Chinese emigrants, Shoong kept close ties with his homeland. He donated 120,000 yuan to support China during the Second Sino-Japanese War, and at his home he entertained Soong Mei-ling, known as Madame Chiang Kai-Shek, wife of Chinese political leader Chiang Kai-shek.

Shoong was a Shriner and 32nd degree Mason.

== Philanthropy ==
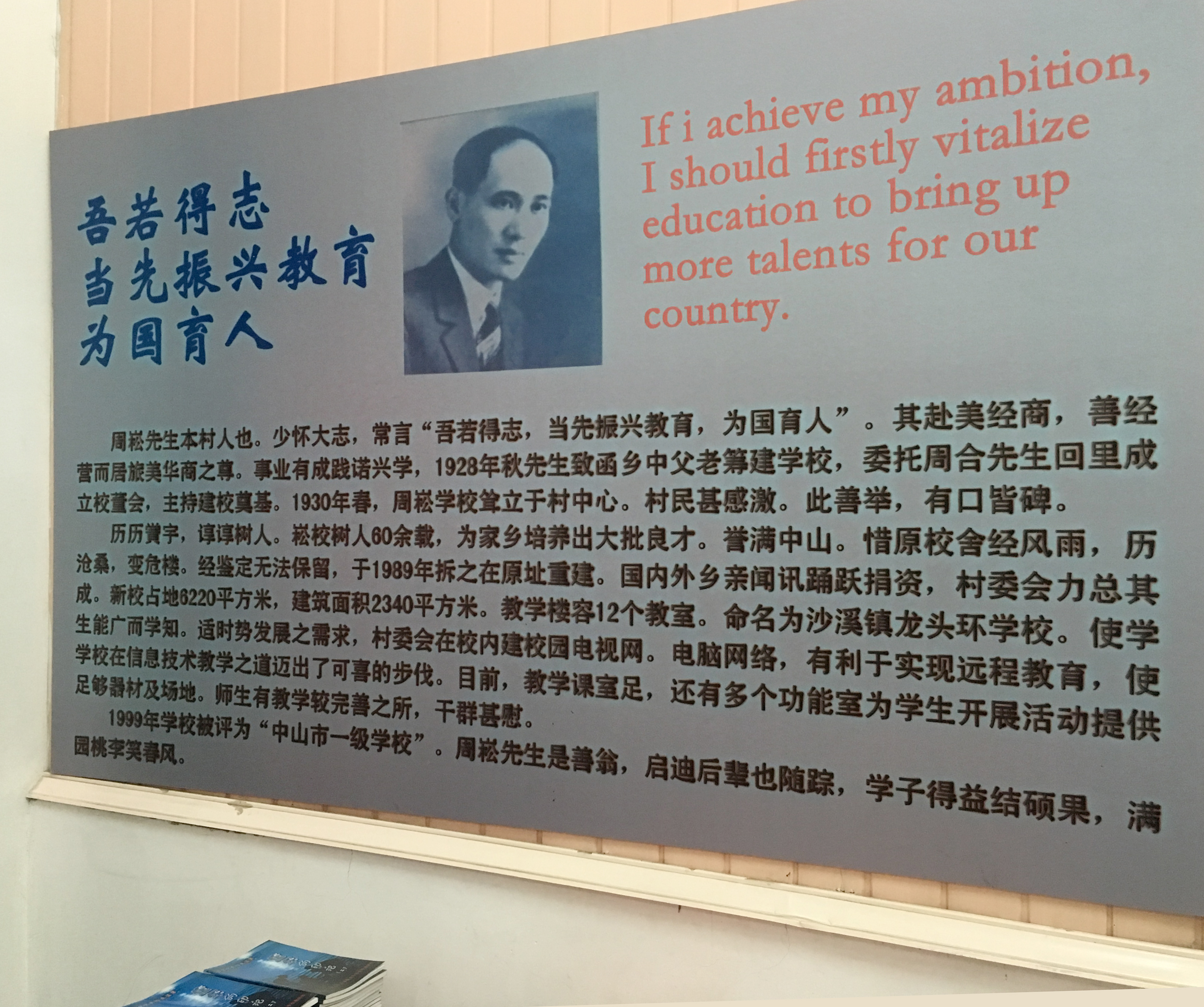
Poster at Joe Shoong School, Long Tau Wan, China

Shoong himself had little formal education, and it was notable that he spoke English with no accent. He believed that education was empowering; thus, a large part of his philanthropy was dedicated to Chinese language schools, cultural institutions and scholarships. In 1928 Shoong gave the money to start a school in his native village in China, Long Tau Wan, as well as a kindergarten named after his wife Rose, and he supported the Longdu Middle School nearby.

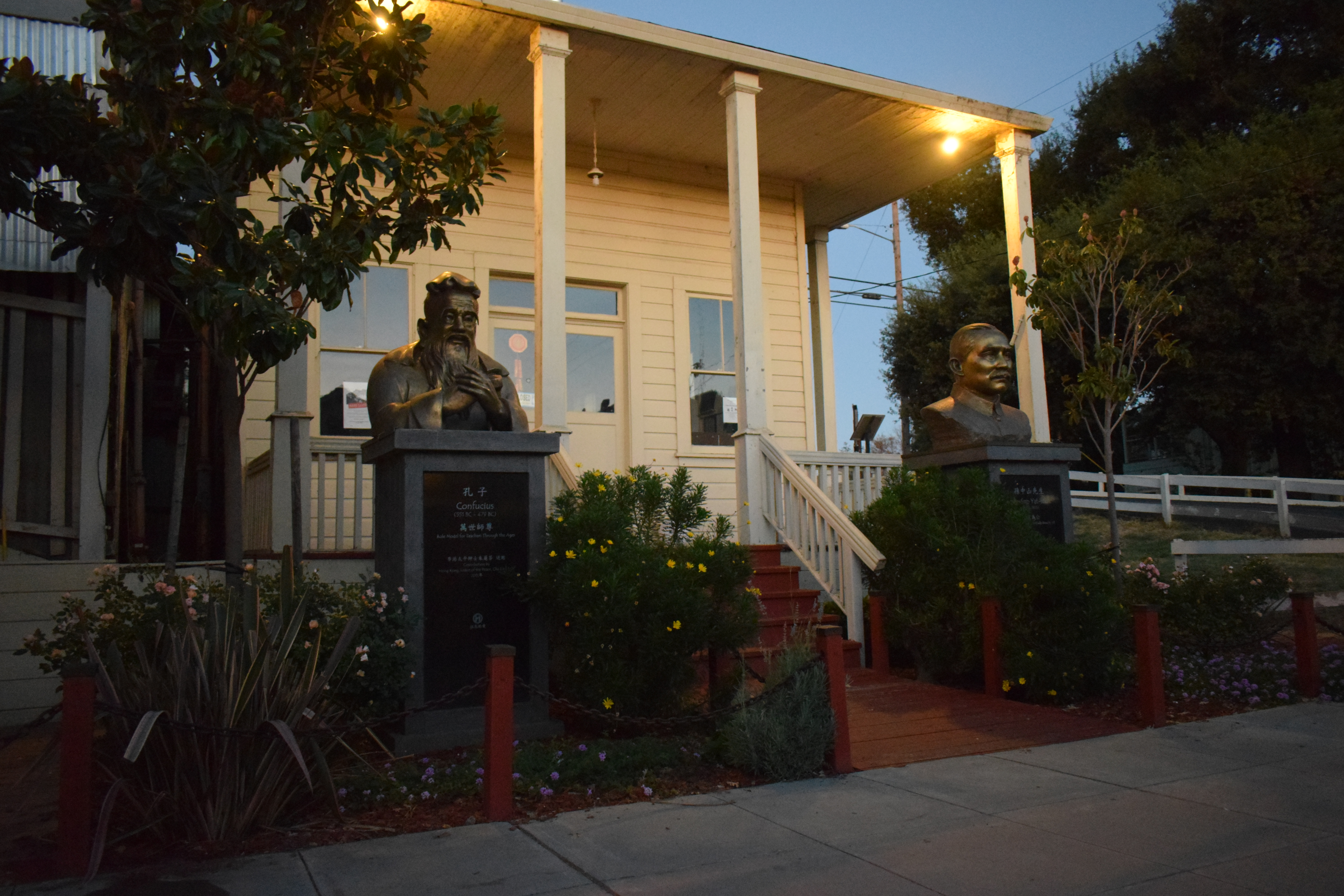
Joe Shoong Chinese School, Locke, California

Joe Shoong himself and the Joe Shoong Foundation – founded after World War II and later called the Milton Shoong Foundation and then the Shoong Foundation – contributed to:

- Chinese Central High School, San Francisco
- Chinese Hospital, San Francisco
- Chinatown YMCA, San Francisco
- Chinese Historical Society of America, San Francisco
- "Little Theater" at Storyland Children's Zoo, San Francisco
- Scholarships at the University of California, Berkeley
- Chinese Community Center and School, now called the Shoong Family Chinese Cultural Center, Oakland Chinatown
- Dragon Slide and Treetop Tea House (renovated in 2014), Children's Fairyland, Oakland
- Renovation of Paramount Theatre, Oakland
- Joe Shoong Chinese School, Locke
- Chung Wah School, Sacramento

Numerous other charities and churches also received donations from the Shoong Foundation. There is a Joe Shoong Park in Las Vegas.

== Personal life ==
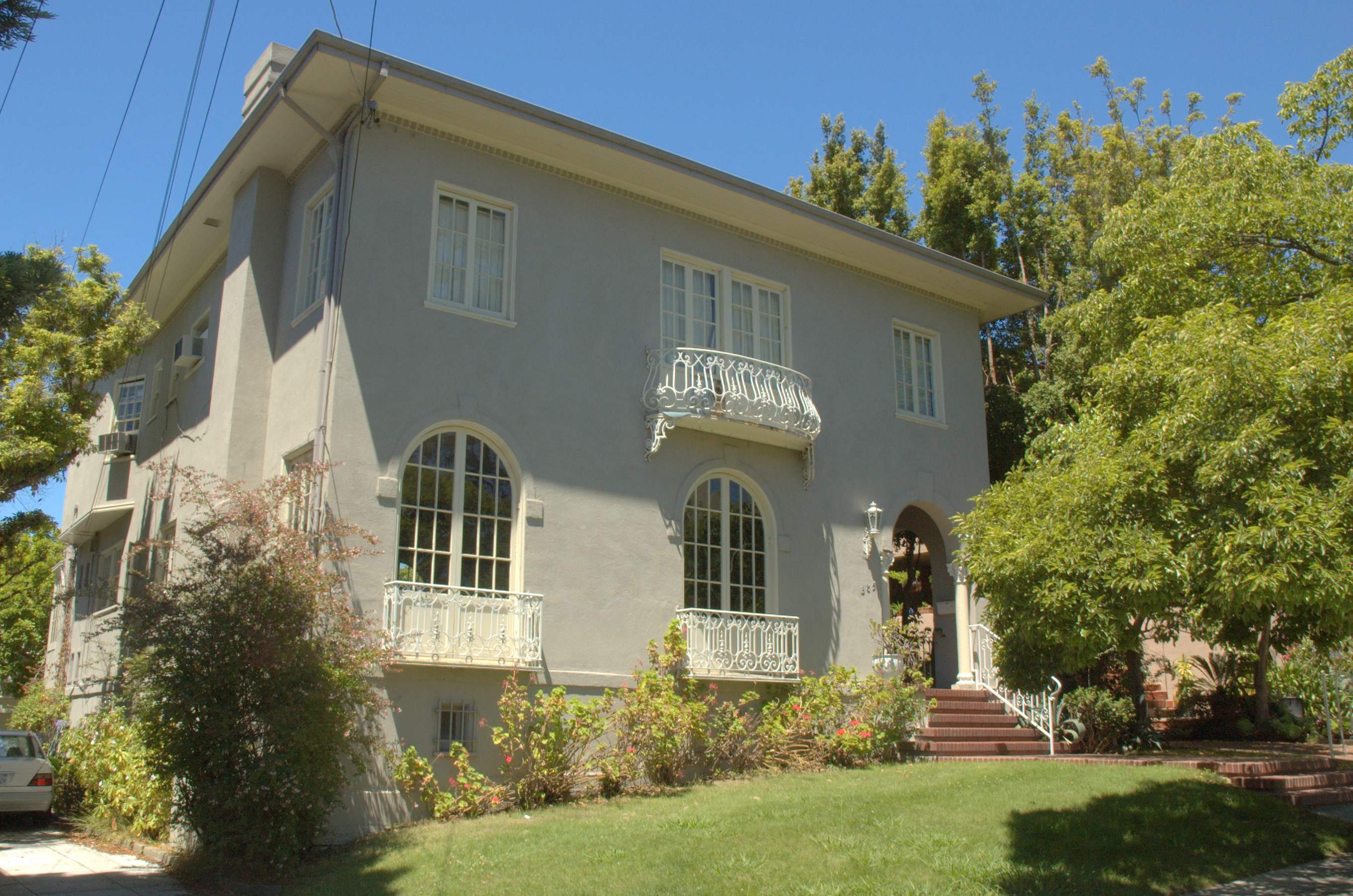
Joe & Rose Shoong House, Oakland, by architect Julia Morgan

Shoong was married to San-Francisco-born Rose Elizabeth SooHoo (16 June 1890 – 20 January 1951). They had two daughters, Betty and Doris, and one son, Milton, and moved from San Francisco to Oakland around 1924 to 385 Bellevue Avenue, a house designed by Julia Morgan, the first female architect licensed in California.

In 1952, a year and a half after Rose's death, Shoong married Ruth Chow.

Shoong was ill from January 1961 and died a few months later, on 13 April at the age of 81. The National Dollar Stores closed for one day in his honor. He is buried at Mountain View Cemetery, Oakland.

Milton Shoong took over the management of the National Dollar Stores and the Shoong Foundation after his father's death.

In 2011, Shoong's daughter Doris Shoong Lee, together with her husband Ted, donated $15 million to the UNLV College of Business, which is now called the Lee Business School. Doris Shoong Lee died in 2018.
